This list of chess players includes people who are primarily known as chess players and have an article on the English Wikipedia.

A 
 Jacob Aagaard (Denmark, Scotland, born 1973)
 Manuel Aaron (India, born 1935)
 Nijat Abasov (Azerbaijan, born 1995)
 István Abonyi (Hungary, 1886–1942)
 Gerald Abrahams (England, 1907–1980)
 Tatev Abrahamyan (Armenia, US, born 1988)
 Hasan Abbasifar (Iran, born 1972)
 Farid Abbasov (Azerbaijan, born 1979)
 Jude Acers (US, born 1944)
 Péter Ács (Hungary, born 1981)
 Weaver Adams (US, 1901–1963)
 Tanitoluwa Adewumi (Nigeria, US, born 2010)
 Utut Adianto (Indonesia, born 1965)
 András Adorján (Hungary, born 1950)
 Vladimir Afromeev (Russia, born 1954)
 Simen Agdestein (Norway, born 1967)
 Evgeny Agrest (Belarus, Sweden, born 1966)
 Georgy Agzamov (Uzbekistan, 1954–1986)
 Carl Ahues (Germany, 1883–1968)
 James Macrae Aitken (Scotland, 1908–1983)
 Ralf Åkesson (Sweden, born 1961)
 Anna Akhsharumova (Russia, US, born 1957)
 Varuzhan Akobian (Armenia, US, born 1983)
 Vladimir Akopian (Armenia, born 1971)
 Mohammed Al-Modiahki (Qatar, born 1974)
 Simon Alapin (Lithuania, 1856–1923)
 Vladimir Alatortsev (Russia, 1909–1987)
 Adolf Albin (Romania, 1848–1920)
 Lev Alburt (Russia, US, born 1945)
 Alexander Alekhine (Russia, France 1892–1946)
 Alexei Alekhine (Russia, 1888–1939)
 Grace Alekhine (US, England, France 1876–1956)
 Aleksej Aleksandrov (Belarus, born 1973)
 Kirill Alekseenko (Russia, born 1997)
 Evgeny Alekseev (Russia, born 1985)
 Hugh Alexander (England, 1899–1974)
 Aaron Alexandre (Germany, France, England 1765–1850)
 Nana Alexandria (Georgia, born 1949)
 Johann Baptist Allgaier (Germany, Austria, 1763–1823)
 Zoltán Almási (Hungary, born 1976)
 Izak Aloni (Poland, Israel, 1905–1985)
 Yoel Aloni (Israel, 1937–2019)
 Boris Alterman (Israel, born 1970)
 Friedrich Amelung (Estonia, Latvia, 1842–1909)
 Bassem Amin (Egypt, born 1988)
 Farrukh Amonatov (Tajikistan, born 1978)
 Bruce Amos (Canada, born 1946)
 An Yangfeng (China, born 1963)
 Viswanathan Anand (India, born 1969)
 Erik Andersen (Denmark, 1904–1938)
 Frank Anderson (Canada, 1928–1980)
 Hope Arthurine Anderson (Jamaica, 1950–2016)
 Adolf Anderssen (Germany, 1818–1879)
 Ulf Andersson (Sweden, born 1951)
 Dmitry Andreikin (Russia, born 1990)
 Zaven Andriasian (Armenia, born 1989)
 Dejan Antić (Serbia, born 1968)
 Rogelio Antonio Jr. (Philippines, born 1962)
 Vladimir Antoshin (Russia, 1929–1994)
 Oskar Antze (Germany, 1878–1962)
 Manuel Apicella (France, born 1970)
 Izaak Appel (Poland, 1905–1941)
 Fricis Apšenieks (Latvia, 1894–1941)
 Lev Aptekar (Ukraine, New Zealand, born 1936)
 José Joaquín Araiza (Mexico, 1900–1971)
 Ketevan Arakhamia-Grant (Georgia, born 1968)
 Mehrdad Ardeshi (Iran, born 1978)
 Walter Arencibia (Cuba, born 1967)
 Alexander Areshchenko (Ukraine, born 1986)
 Keith Arkell (England, born 1961)
 Romanas Arlauskas (Lithuania, Australia, 1917–2009)
 Jon Arnason (Iceland, born 1960)
 Dagur Arngrímsson (Iceland, born 1987)
 Levon Aronian (Armenia, born 1982)
 Lev Aronin (Russia, 1920–1983)
 Vladislav Artemiev (Russia, born 1998)
 Andreas Ascharin (Estonia, Latvia, 1843–1896)
 Jacob Ascher (England, Canada, 1841–1912)
 Konstantin Aseev (Russia, 1960–2004)
 Maurice Ashley (Jamaica, US, born 1966)
 Karen Asrian (Armenia, 1980–2008)
 Bibisara Assaubayeva (Kazakhstan, Russia, born 2004)
 Abu Bakr bin Yahya al-Suli (Abbasid Caliphate, c.880–946)
 Lajos Asztalos (Austria-Hungary, Yugoslavia, Hungary, 1889–1956)
 Ekaterina Atalik (Russia, Turkey, born 1982)
 Suat Atalık (Turkey, born 1964)
 Henry Atkins (England, 1872–1955)
 Arnold Aurbach (Poland, France, c.1888–1952)
 Yuri Averbakh (Russia, c.1922–2022)
 Valeriy Aveskulov (Ukraine, born 1986)
 Herbert Avram (US, 1913–2006)
 Boris Avrukh (Israel, born 1978)

B 
 Alexander Baburin (Russia, Ireland, born 1967)
 Étienne Bacrot (France, born 1983)
 Paul Baender (Germany, Bolivia, 1906–1985)
 Giorgi Bagaturov (Georgia, born 1964)
 Amir Bagheri (Iran, born 1978)
 Camilla Baginskaite (Soviet Union, Lithuania, US, born 1967)
 Vladimir Bagirov (USSR, Latvia, 1936–2000)
 Mary Bain (US, 1904–1972)
 David Graham Baird (US, 1854–1913)
 Vladimir Baklan (Ukraine, born 1978)
 Yuri Balashov (Russia, born 1949)
 Rosendo Balinas Jr. (Philippines, 1941–1998)
 Zoltán von Balla (Hungary, 1883–1945)
 Csaba Balogh (Hungary, born 1987)
 János Balogh (Romania, Hungary, 1892–1980)
 Julio Balparda (Uruguay, ?–1942)
 Amikam Balshan (Israel, born 1948)
 Hristos Banikas (Greece, born 1978)
 Anatoly Bannik (Ukraine, 1921–2013)
 David Baramidze (Georgia, Germany, born 1988)
 Zsigmond Barász (Hungary, 1878–1935)
 Abraham Baratz (Romania, France, 1895–1975)
 Gerardo Barbero (Argentina, Hungary, 1961–2001)
 Gedeon Barcza (Hungary, 1911–1986)
 Olaf Barda (Norway, 1909–1971)
 Curt von Bardeleben (Germany, 1861–1924)
 Leonard Barden (England, born 1929)
 Evgeny Bareev (Russia, born 1966)
 Robert Henry Barnes (England, New Zealand 1849–1916)
 Thomas Wilson Barnes (England, 1825–1874)
 Alexei Barsov (Uzbekistan, born 1966)
 Mateusz Bartel (Poland, born 1985)
 John Bartholomew (US, born 1986)
 Dibyendu Barua (India, born 1966)
 Cerdas Barus (Indonesia, born 1961)
 Michael Basman (England, born 1946)
 Christian Bauer (France, born 1977)
 Johann Hermann Bauer (Bohemia, Austria, 1861–1891)
 Friedrich Baumbach (Germany, born 1935)
 Albert Becker (Austria, Germany, Argentina 1896–1984)
 Anjelina Belakovskaia (Ukraine, US, born 1969)
 Liudmila Belavenets (Russia, 1940–2021)
 Sergey Belavenets (Russia, 1910–1942)
 Alexander Beliavsky (Ukraine, Slovenia, born 1953)
 Slim Belkhodja (Tunisia, born 1962)
 Jana Bellin (Czechoslovakia, England, born 1947)
 Zdzisław Belsitzmann (Poland, circa 1890–1920)
 Levi Benima (Netherlands, 1837–1922)
 Clarice Benini (Italy, 1905–1976)
 Joel Benjamin (US, born 1964)
 Francisco Benkö (Germany, Argentina, 1910–2010)
 Pal Benko (France, Hungary, US, 1928–2019)
 Dávid Bérczes (Hungary, born 1990)
 Emanuel Berg (Sweden, born 1981)
 Béla Berger (Hungary, Australia, 1931–2005)
 Johann Berger (Austria, 1845–1933)
 Victor Berger (Ukraine, England, 1904–1996)
 Nils Bergkvist (Sweden, 1900–?)
 Teodors Bergs (Latvia, 1902–1966)
 Hans Berliner (Germany, US, 1929–2017)
 Ivar Bern (Norway, born 1967)
 Karl Berndtsson (Sweden, 1892–1943)
 Jacob Bernstein (US, ?–1958)
 Ossip Bernstein (Ukraine, France, 1882–1962)
 Sidney Norman Bernstein (US, 1911–1992)
 Mario Bertok (Croatia, 1929–2008)
 Katarina Beskow (Sweden, 1867–1939)
 Louis Betbeder Matibet (France, 1901–1986)
 Kārlis Bētiņš (Latvia, 1867–1943)
 Siegmund Beutum (Austria, 1890–1966)
 Vinay Bhat (US, born 1984)
 Carlos Bielicki (Argentina, born 1940)
 Martin Bier (Germany, 1854–1934)
 Horace Bigelow (US, 1898–1980)
 István Bilek (Hungary, 1932–2010)
 Paul Rudolf von Bilguer (Germany, 1815–1840)
 Maurice Billecard (France, 1876–?)
 Reefat Bin-Sattar (Bangladesh, born 1974)
 Henry Bird (England, 1830–1908)
 Nathan Birnboim (Israel, born 1950)
 Klaus Bischoff (Germany, born 1961)
 Arthur Bisguier (US, 1929–2017)
 Peter Biyiasas (Greece, Canada, born 1950)
 Dimitrije Bjelica (Serbia, born 1935)
 Roy Turnbull Black (US, 1888–1962)
 Joseph Henry Blackburne (England, 1841–1924)
 Armand Blackmar (US, 1826–1888)
 Joseph Henry Blake (England, 1859–1951)
 Abram Blass (Poland, Israel, 1895–1971)
 Ottó Bláthy (Hungary, 1860–1939)
 Max Blau (Germany, Switzerland, 1918–1984)
 Ludwig Bledow (Germany, 1795–1846)
 Paweł Blehm (Poland, born 1980)
 Dirk Bleijkmans (Netherlands, Indonesia, 1875–?)
 Yaacov Bleiman (Lithuania, Israel, 1947–2004)
 Calvin Blocker (US, born 1955)
 Claude Bloodgood (US, 1937–2001)
 Oscar Blum (Lithuania, France, born before 1910)
 Benjamin Blumenfeld (Belarus, Russia, 1884–1947)
 Max Blümich (Germany, 1886–1942)
 Boris Blumin (Russia, Canada, US, 1907–1998)
 Milko Bobotsov (Bulgaria, 1931–2000)
 Dmitry Bocharov (Russia, born 1982)
 Samuel Boden (England, 1826–1882)
 Fedor Bogatyrchuk (Ukraine, Canada, 1892–1984)
 Efim Bogoljubov (Ukraine, Germany, 1889–1952)
 Paolo Boi (Italy, 1528–1598)
 Jacobo Bolbochán (Argentina, 1906–1984)
 Julio Bolbochán (Argentina, 1920–1996)
 Isaac Boleslavsky (Ukraine, Russia, Belarus, 1919–1977)
 Victor Bologan (Moldova, born 1971)
 Igor Bondarevsky (Russia, 1913–1979)
 Eero Böök (Finland, 1910–1990)
 Valentina Borisenko (Russia, 1920–1993)
 Olexandr Bortnyk (Ukraine, born 1996)
 Tea Bosboom-Lanchava (Netherlands, Georgia, born 1974)
 George Botterill (England, Wales, born 1949)
 Mikhail Botvinnik (Russia, 1911–1995)
 Louis-Charles Mahé de La Bourdonnais (France, 1795–1840)
 César Boutteville (Vietnam, France, 1917–2015)
 Olena Boytsun (Ukraine, born 1983)
 Julius Brach (Czechoslovakia, 1881–1938)
 Gyula Breyer (Hungary, 1893–1921)
 Alfred Brinckmann (Germany, 1891–1967)
 Mirko Bröder (Hungary, Serbia, 1911–1943)
 Miklós Bródy (Hungary, Romania, 1877–1949)
 Vladimir Bron (Ukraine, 1909–1985)
 David Bronstein (Ukraine, 1924–2006)
 Walter Browne (Australia, US, 1949–2015)
 Agnieszka Brustman (Poland, born 1962)
 Lázaro Bruzón (Cuba, born 1982)
 Stellan Brynell (Sweden, born 1962)
 Bu Xiangzhi (China, born 1985)
 Henry Thomas Buckle (England, 1821–1862)
 Gerardo Budowski (Germany, France, Venezuela, Costa Rica, 1925–2014)
 Wincenty Budzyński (Poland, France, 1815–1866)
 Nataliya Buksa (Ukraine, born 1996)
 Constant Ferdinand Burille (France, US, 1866–1914)
 Amos Burn (England, 1848–1925)
 Algimantas Butnorius (Lithuania, 1946–2017)
 Elisabeth Bykova (Russia, 1913–1989)
 Donald Byrne (US, 1930–1976)
 Robert Byrne (US, 1928–2013)

C 
 Florencio Campomanes (Philippines, 1927–2010)
 Daniel Hugo Cámpora (Argentina, born 1957)
 Esteban Canal (Peru, Italy, 1896–1981)
 Arianne Caoili (Australia, 1986–2020)
 José Raúl Capablanca (Cuba, 1888–1942)
 Rodolfo Tan Cardoso (Philippines, 1937–2013)
 Ruth Volgl Cardoso (Brazil, 1934–2000)
 Carl Carls (Germany, 1880–1958)
 Magnus Carlsen (Norway, born 1990)
 Pontus Carlsson (Sweden, born 1982)
 Horatio Caro (England, Germany, 1862–1920)
 Berna Carrasco (Chile, 1914–2013)
 Pietro Carrera (Sicily, 1573–1647)
 Fabiano Caruana (Dual citizenship: US and Italy, born 1992)
 Vincenzo Castaldi (Italy, 1916–1970)
 Mariano Castillo (Chile, 1905–1970)
 Mišo Cebalo (Croatia, born 1945)
 Giovanni Cenni (Italy, 1881–1957)
 Alfonso Ceron (Spain, 1535–?)
 Oscar Chajes (Ukraine, Austria, US, 1873–1928)
 Ferenc Chalupetzky (Hungary, 1886–1951)
 Edward Chamier (England, France, 1840–1892)
 Chan Peng Kong (Singapore, born 1956)
 Sandipan Chanda (India, born 1983)
 Chang Tung Lo (China, born before 1960)
 Murray Chandler (New Zealand, England, born 1960)
 Pascal Charbonneau (Canada, born 1983)
 Rudolf Charousek (Hungary, 1873–1900)
 Chantal Chaudé de Silans (France, 1919–2001)
 Valery Chekhov (Russia, born 1955)
 Vitaly Chekhover (Russia, 1908–1965)
 Chen De (China, born 1949)
 Ivan Cheparinov (Bulgaria, born 1986)
 Alexander Cherepkov (Russia, 1920–2009)
 Irving Chernev (Russia, US, 1900–1981)
 Tykhon Cherniaiev (Ukraine, born 2010)
 Alexander Chernin (Ukraine, Hungary, born 1960)
 Konstantin Chernyshov (Russia, born 1967)
 André Chéron (France, 1895–1980)
 Maia Chiburdanidze (Georgia, born 1961)
 Mikhail Chigorin (Russia, 1850–1908)
 Larry Christiansen (US, born 1956)
 Vladimir Chuchelov (Russia, Belgium, born 1969)
 Slavko Cicak (Montenegro, Sweden, born 1969)
 Roberto Cifuentes (Chile, Netherlands, Spain, born 1957)
 Victor Ciocâltea (Romania, 1932–1983)
 Hermann Clemenz (Estonia, 1846–1908)
 Albert Clerc (France, 1830–1918)
 Viktorija Čmilytė (Lithuania, born 1983)
 John Cochrane (England, 1798–1878)
 Erich Cohn (Germany, 1884–1918)
 Wilhelm Cohn (Germany, 1859–1913)
 Edgard Colle (Belgium, 1897–1932)
 John W. Collins (US, 1912–2001)
 Eugene Ernest Colman (England, 1878–1964)
 Camila Colombo (Uruguay, born 1990)
 Adrián García Conde (Mexico, England, 1886–1943)
 Stuart Conquest (England, born 1967)
 Anya Corke (England, Hong Kong, born 1990)
 Nicolaas Cortlever (Netherlands, 1915–1995)
 Juan Corzo (Cuba, 1873–1941)
 Carlo Cozio (Italy, c. 1715 – c. 1780)
 Spencer Crakanthorp (Australia, 1885–1936)
 Pia Cramling (Sweden, born 1963)
 Robert Crépeaux (France, 1900–1994)
 Walter Cruz (Brazil, 1910–1967)
 István Csom (Hungary, 1940–2021)
 Miguel Cuéllar (Colombia, 1916–1985)
 Josef Cukierman (Poland, France, 1900–1941)
 John Curdo (US, born 1931)
 Ognjen Cvitan (Croatia, born 1961)
 Hieronim Czarnowski (Poland, France, Austria-Hungary, 1834–1902)
 Moshe Czerniak (Poland, Israel, 1910–1984)

D 
 Arthur Dake (US, 1910–2000)
 Pedro Damiano (Portugal, 1480–1544)
 Mato Damjanović (Croatia, 1927–2011)
 Gösta Danielsson (Sweden, 1912–1978)
 Silvio Danailov (Bulgaria, born 1961)
 A. Polak Daniels (Netherlands, before 1855–after 1883)
 Dawid Daniuszewski (Poland, 1885–1944)
 Klaus Darga (Germany, born 1934)
 Alberto David (Luxembourg, born 1970)
 Jacques Davidson (Netherlands, 1890–1961)
 Nigel Davies (England, born 1960)
 Boris de Greiff (Colombia, 1930–2011)
 Bogdan-Daniel Deac (Romania, born 2001)
 Frederick Deacon (Belgium, 1829–1875)
 Chakkravarthy Deepan (India, born 1987)
 Nick de Firmian (US, born 1957)
 Marigje Degrande (Belgium, born 1992)
 Aleksander Delchev (Bulgaria, born 1971)
 Eugene Delmar (US, 1841–1909)
 Yelena Dembo (Russia, Israel, Hungary, Greece, born 1983)
 Arnold Denker (US, 1914–2005)
 Alexandre Deschapelles (France, 1780–1847)
 Andrei Deviatkin (Russia, born 1980)
 Paul Devos (Belgium, 1911–1981)
 André Diamant (Brazil, born 1990)
 Mark Diesen (US, 1957–2008)
 Julius Dimer (Germany, 1871–1945)
 Nathan Divinsky (Canada, 1925–2012)
 Rune Djurhuus (Norway, born 1970)
 Maxim Dlugy (Russia, US, born 1966)
 Josef Dobiáš (Bohemia, Czechoslovakia, 1886–1981)
 Yosef Dobkin (Russia, Israel, 1909–1977)
 Yury Dokhoian (Russia, 1964–2021)
 Sergey Dolmatov (Russia, born 1959)
 Lenier Dominguez (Cuba, born 1983)
 Józef Dominik (Poland, 1894–1920)
 Zadok Domnitz (Israel, born 1933)
 Elena Donaldson (Russia, Georgia, US, 1957–2012)
 John W. Donaldson (US, born 1958)
 Ivo Donev (Austria, born 1959)
 Jan Hein Donner (Netherlands, 1927–1988)
 Iossif Dorfman (Ukraine, France, born 1952)
 Alexey Dreev (Russia, born 1969)
 Leonids Dreibergs (Latvia, US, 1908–1969)
 Kurt Dreyer (Germany, South Africa, 1909–1981)
 Tihomil Drezga (Croatia, US, 1903–1981)
 Yuri Drozdovskij (Ukraine, born 1984)
 Leroy Dubeck (US, born 1939)
 Serafino Dubois (Italy, 1817–1899)
 Daniil Dubov (Russia, born 1996)
 Andreas Dückstein (Hungary, Austria, born 1927)
 Jan-Krzysztof Duda (Poland, born 1998)
 Jean Dufresne (Germany, 1829–1893)
 Andreas Duhm (Germany, Switzerland, 1883–1975)
 Dietrich Duhm (Germany, Switzerland, 1880–1954)
 Hans Duhm (Germany, Switzerland, 1878–1946)
 Arthur Dunkelblum (Poland, Belgium, 1906–1979)
 Oldřich Duras (Bohemia, Czechoslovakia, 1882–1957)
 Fyodor Duz-Khotimirsky (Ukraine, 1879–1965)
 Mark Dvoretsky (Russia, 1947–2016)
 Joanna Dworakowska (Poland, born 1978)
 Eduard Dyckhoff (Germany, 1880–1949)
 Viacheslav Dydyshko (Belarus, born 1949)
 Boruch Israel Dyner (Poland, Belgium, Israel, 1903–1979)
 Semen Dvoirys (Russia, born 1958)
 Nana Dzagnidze (Georgia, born 1987)
 Roman Dzindzichashvili (Georgia, Israel, US, born 1944)
 Marat Dzhumaev (Uzbekistan, born 1976)
 Ding Liren (China, born 1992)

E 
 James Eade (US, born 1957)
 Zahar Efimenko (Ukraine, born 1985)
 Marsel Efroimski (Israel, born 1995)
 Jaan Ehlvest (Estonia, born 1962)
 Louis Eichborn (Germany, 1812–1882)
 Rakhil Eidelson (Belarus, born 1958)
 Vereslav Eingorn (Ukraine, born 1956)
 Louis Eisenberg (Ukraine, US, 1876–after 1909)
 Bengt Ekenberg (Sweden, 1912–1986)
 Folke Ekström (Sweden, 1906–2000)
 Erich Eliskases (Austria, Germany, Argentina, 1913–1997)
 Pavel Eljanov (Ukraine, born 1983)
 Moissei Eljaschoff (Lithuania, 1870–1919)
 John Emms (England, born 1967)
 Lūcijs Endzelīns (Estonia, Latvia, Australia, 1909–1981)
 Jens Enevoldsen (Denmark, 1907–1980)
 Ludwig Engels (Germany, Brazil, 1905–1967)
 Berthold Englisch (Austria, 1851–1897)
 David Enoch (Israel, 1901–1949)
 Vladimir Epishin (Russia, born 1965)
 Stefan Erdélyi (Hungary, Romania, 1905–1968)
 Hanna Ereńska (Poland, born 1946)
 Arjun Erigaisi (India, born 2003)
 Evgenij Ermenkov (Bulgaria, Palestine, born 1949)
 Wilhelm Ernst (Germany, 1905–1952)
 John Angus Erskine (New Zealand, Australia, 1873–1960)
 Andrey Esipenko (Russia, born 2002)
 Yakov Estrin (Russia, 1923–1987)
 Max Euwe (Netherlands, 1901–1981)
 Larry M. Evans (US, 1932–2010)
 William Davies Evans (Wales, 1790–1872)
 Alexander Evensohn (Ukraine, 1892–1919)
 Győző Exner (Hungary, 1864–1945)

F 
 Samuel Factor (Poland, US, 1883–1949)
 Louisa Matilda Fagan (Italy, England, 1850–1931)
 Hugo Fähndrich (Hungary, Austria, 1851–1930)
 Hans Fahrni (Bohemia, Switzerland, 1874–1939)
 William Fairhurst (England, Scotland, New Zealand, 1903–1982)
 Sammi Fajarowicz (Germany, 1908–1940)
 Raphael Falk (Russia, 1856–1913)
 Ernst Falkbeer (Austria-Hungary, 1819–1885)
 Stefan Fazekas (Hungary, Czechoslovakia, England, 1898–1967)
 Sergey Fedorchuk (Ukraine, born 1981)
 Alexei Fedorov (Belarus, born 1972)
 John Fedorowicz (US, born 1958)
 Vladimir Fedoseev (Russia, born 1995)
 Movsas Feigins (Latvia, Argentina, 1908–1950)
 Rafał Feinmesser (Poland, born before 1906)
 Florin Felecan (Romania, US, born 1980)
 Virgilio Fenoglio (Argentina, 1902–1990)
 Arthur Feuerstein (US, born 1935)
 Alexandr Fier (Brazil, born 1988)
 Martha Fierro (Ecuador, born 1977)
 Miroslav Filip (Czech Republic, 1928–2009)
 Anton Filippov (Uzbekistan, born 1986)
 Reuben Fine (US, 1914–1993)
 Ben Finegold (US, born 1969)
 Julius Finn (Poland, US, 1871–1931)
 Nick de Firmian (US, born 1957)
 Alireza Firouzja (Iran, France, born 2003)
 Robert James Fischer (US, Iceland, 1943–2008)
 Alex Fishbein (US, born 1968)
 Alexander Flamberg (Poland, 1880–1926)
 Alfred Flatow (Germany, Australia, born 1937)
 Glenn Flear (England, born 1959)
 Ernst Flechsig (Germany, 1852–1890)
 Bernhard Fleissig (Hungary, Austria, 1853–1931)
 Max Fleissig (Hungary, Austria, 1845–after 1882)
 János Flesch (Hungary, 1933–1983)
 Salo Flohr (Ukraine, Czechoslovakia, Russia, 1908–1983)
 Rodrigo Flores (Chile, 1913–2007)
 Alberto Foguelman (Argentina, 1923–2013)
 Jan Foltys (Czechoslovakia, 1908–1952)
 George Salto Fontein (Netherlands, 1890–1963)
 Leó Forgács (Hungary, 1881–1930)
 Győző Forintos (Hungary, 1935–2018)
 Albert Fox (US, 1881–1964)
 Maurice Fox (Ukraine, Canada, 1898–1988)
 Selim Franklin (England, US, 1814–1884)
 Zenon Franco (Paraguay, born 1956)
 Laurent Fressinet (France, born 1981)
 Sergey von Freymann (Russia, Uzbekistan, 1882–1946)
 Joel Fridlizius (Sweden, 1869–1963)
 Daniel Fridman (Latvia, Germany, born 1976)
 Frederic Friedel (Germany, born 1945)
 Gunnar Friedemann (Estonia, 1909–1943)
 David Friedgood (South Africa, England, born 1946)
 Henryk Friedman (Poland, 1903–1942)
 Alexander Fritz (Germany, 1857–1932)
 Martin Severin From (Denmark, 1828–1895)
 Achilles Frydman (Poland, 1905–1940)
 Paulino Frydman (Poland, Argentina, 1905–1982)
 Ľubomír Ftáčnik (Czechoslovakia, Slovakia, born 1957)
 Andrija Fuderer (Vojvodina, Belgium, 1931–2011)
 Semyon Furman (Russia, 1920–1978)
 Ivana Maria Furtado (India, born 1999)
 Géza Füster (Hungary, Canada, 1910–1990)
 Roy Fyllingen (Norway, born 1975)

G 
 Merab Gagunashvili (Georgia, born 1985)
 Aleksandr Galkin (Russia, born 1979)
 Joseph Gallagher (England, Switzerland, born 1964)
 Alisa Galliamova (Russia, born 1972)
 Surya Shekhar Ganguly (India, born 1983)
 Nona Gaprindashvili (Georgia, born 1941)
 Valeriane Gaprindashvili (Georgia, born 1982)
 Carlos Garcia Palermo (Argentina, Italy, born 1953)
 Raimundo García (Argentina, 1936–2020)
 Timur Gareev (Uzbekistan, born 1988)
 Eldar Gasanov (Ukraine, born 1982)
 Vugar Gashimov (Azerbaijan, 1986–2014)
 Anna Gasik (Poland, born 1988)
 Einar Gausel (Norway, born 1963)
 Viktor Gavrikov (Lithuania, Switzerland, 1957–2016)
 Tamaz Gelashvili (Georgia, born 1978)
 Boris Gelfand (Belarus, Israel, born 1968)
 Efim Geller (Ukraine, 1925–1998)
 Uzi Geller (Israel, born 1931)
 Petar Genov (Bulgaria, born 1970)
 Kiril Georgiev (Bulgaria, born 1965)
 Krum Georgiev (Bulgaria, born 1958)
 Ernő Gereben (Hungary, Switzerland 1907–1988)
 Regina Gerlecka (Poland, 1913–1983)
 Eugênio German (Brazil, 1930–2001)
 Theodor Germann (Latvia, 1879–1935)
 Alik Gershon (Israel, born 1980)
 Edward Gerstenfeld (Poland, Ukraine 1915–1943)
 Georgy Geshev (Bulgaria, 1903–1937)
 Ehsan Ghaem Maghami (Iran, born 1982)
 Tigran Gharamian (France, born 1984)
 Ameet Ghasi (England, born 1987)
 Florin Gheorghiu (Romania, born 1944)
 Amédée Gibaud (France, 1885–1957)
 Johannes Giersing (Denmark, 1872–1954)
 Ellen Gilbert (US, 1837–1900)
 Jessie Gilbert (England, 1987–2006)
 Karl Gilg (Czechoslovakia, Germany, 1901–1981)
 Aivars Gipslis (Latvia, 1937–2000)
 Anish Giri (Netherlands, born 1994)
 Matteo Gladig (Italy, 1880–1915)
 Eduard Glass (Austria, 1902–after 1980)
 Evgeny Gleizerov (Russia, born 1963)
 Igor Glek (Russia, Germany, born 1961)
 Svetozar Gligorić (Serbia, 1923–2012)
 Fernand Gobet (Switzerland, born 1962)
 Michele Godena (Italy, born 1967)
 Carl Goering (Germany, 1841–1879)
 Alphonse Goetz (France, 1865–1934)
 Leonid Gofshtein (Israel, 1953–2015)
 Jason Goh Koon-Jong (Singapore, born 1989)
 Goh Weiming (Singapore, born 1983)
 Samuel Gold (Hungary, Austria, US, 1835–1920)
 Alexander Goldin (Russia, born 1965)
 Rusudan Goletiani (Georgia, US, born 1980)
 Celso Golmayo Torriente (Cuba, Spain, 1879–1924)
 Celso Golmayo Zúpide (Spain, Cuba, 1820–1898)
 Manuel Golmayo Torriente (Cuba, Spain, 1883–1973)
 Vitali Golod (Ukraine, Israel born 1971)
 Harry Golombek (England, 1911–1995)
 Alexander Goloshchapov (Ukraine, born 1978)
 Alexander Ferdinand von der Goltz (Germany, 1819–1858)
 Valentina Golubenko (Estonia, Croatia, born 1990)
 Mikhail Golubev (Ukraine, born 1970)
 Aleksei Goncharov (Russia, 1879–1913)
 Gong Qianyun (China, born 1985)
 Jayson Gonzales (Philippines, born 1969)
 José González García (Mexico, born 1973)
 Juan Carlos González Zamora (Mexico, born 1968)
 David S. Goodman (England, US, born 1958)
 Stephen J. Gordon (England, born 1986)
 Danny Gormally (England, born 1976)
 Aleksandra Goryachkina (Russia, born 1998)
 George H. D. Gossip (US, England, 1841–1907)
 Solomon Gotthilf (Russia, 1903–1967)
 Hermann von Gottschall (Germany, 1862–1933)
 Boris Grachev (Russia, born 1986)
 Alexander Graf (Uzbekistan, Germany, born 1962)
 Sonja Graf (Germany, Argentina, US, 1908–1965)
 Julio Granda Zuniga (Peru, born 1967)
 Roberto Grau (Argentina, 1900–1944)
 Gioachino Greco (Italy, 1600 – c. 1634)
 Ewen McGowen Green (New Zealand, born 1950)
 Alon Greenfeld  (US, Israel, born 1964)
 John Grefe (US, 1947–2013)
 Bernhard Gregory (Estonia, Germany, 1879–1939)
 Gisela Kahn Gresser (US, 1906–2000)
 Helgi Grétarsson (Iceland, born 1977)
 Richard Griffith (England, 1872–1955)
 Nikolay Grigoriev (Russia, 1895–1935)
 Avetik Grigoryan (Armenia, born 1989)
 Vincent Grimm (Austria, Hungary, 1800–1872)
 Alexander Grischuk (Russia, born 1983)
 Efstratios Grivas (Greece, born 1966)
 Henri Grob (Switzerland, 1904–1974)
 Aristide Gromer (France, 1908–1966)
 Adriaan de Groot (Netherlands, 1914–2006)
 Ernst Grünfeld (Austria, 1893–1962)
 Yehuda Gruenfeld (Poland, Israel, born 1956)
 James Grundy (England, US, 1855–1919)
 Izaak Grynfeld (Poland, Israel, born 1920)
 Gu Xiaobing  (China, born 1985)
 Ion Gudju (Romania, 1897–1988)
 Eduard Gufeld (Ukraine, US, 1936–2002)
 Ilse Guggenberger (Colombia, born 1942)
 Carlos Guimard (Argentina, 1913–1998)
 Vidit Gujrathi (India, born 1994)
 Boris Gulko  (Russia, US, born 1947)
 Gunnar Gundersen (France, Norway, Australia, 1882–1943)
 Isidor Gunsberg (Hungary, England, 1854–1930)
 Abhijeet Gupta (India, born 1989)
 Dmitry Gurevich (Russia, US, born 1956)
 Ilya Gurevich (Ukraine, US, born 1972)
 Mikhail Gurevich (Ukraine, Belgium, Turkey, born 1959)
 Bukhuti Gurgenidze (Georgia, 1933–2008)
 Jan Gustafsson (Germany, born 1979)
 Emanuel Guthi (Israel, born 1938)
 Lev Gutman (Latvia, Israel, Germany, born 1945)
 Fritz Gygli (Switzerland, 1896–1980)
 Alfred William Gyles (New Zealand, 1888–1967)

H 
 Anna Hahn (Latvia, US, born 1976)
 Vitaly Halberstadt (Ukraine, France, 1903–1967)
 Alexander Halprin (Russia, Austria, 1868–1921)
 Tunç Hamarat (Turkey, Austria, born 1946)
 Hichem Hamdouchi (Morocco, born 1972)
 Rani Hamid (Bangladesh, born 1944)
 Jon Ludvig Hammer (Norway, born 1990)
 Carl Hamppe (Switzerland, Austria, 1814–1876)
 Milton Hanauer (US, 1908–1988)
 James Hanham (US, 1840–1923)
 Hermann von Hanneken (Germany, 1810–1886)
 Curt Hansen (Denmark, born 1964)
 Wilhelm Hanstein (Germany, 1811–1850)
 Khosro Harandi (Iran, 1950–2019)
 Dronavalli Harika (India, born 1991)
 Pendyala Harikrishna (India, born 1986)
 Max Harmonist (Germany, 1864–1907)
 Daniel Harrwitz (Germany, France, 1823–1884)
 William Hartston (England, born 1947)
 Wolfgang Hasenfuss (Latvia, 1900–1944)
 Stewart Haslinger (England, born 1981)
 Arnaud Hauchard (France, born 1971)
 Cécile Haussernot (France, born 1998)
 Kornél Havasi (Hungary, 1892–1945)
 Jonathan Hawkins (England, born 1983)
 Mark Hebden (England, born 1958)
 Bartłomiej Heberla (Poland, born 1985)
 Jean Hébert (Canada, born 1957)
 Hans-Joachim Hecht (Germany, born 1939)
 Jonny Hector (Sweden, born 1964)
 Fenny Heemskerk (Netherlands, 1919–2007)
 Wolfgang Heidenfeld (Germany, South Africa, Ireland, 1911–1981)
 Jakub Heilpern (Poland, 1850–1910)
 Herbert Heinicke (Brazil, Germany, 1905–1988)
 Arved Heinrichsen (Lithuania, 1879–1900)
 Dan Heisman (US, born 1950)
 Grigory Helbach (Russia, 1863–1930)
 Karl Helling (Germany, 1904–1937)
 Johan Hellsten (Sweden, born 1975)
 Hermann Helms (US, 1870–1963)
 Ron Henley (US, born 1956)
 Moriz Henneberger (Switzerland, 1878–1959)
 Walter Henneberger (Switzerland, 1883–1969)
 Deen Hergott (Canada, born 1962)
 Sigmund Herland (Romania, 1865–1954)
 Róża Herman (Poland, 1902–1995)
 Gilberto Hernández Guerrero (Mexico, born 1970)
Robert Hess (US, born 1991)
 Tiger Hillarp Persson (Sweden, born 1970)
 Wilhelm Hilse (Germany, 1878–1940)
 Moshe Hirschbein (Poland, 1894–1940)
 Moses Hirschel (Germany, 1754 – c. 1823)
 Philipp Hirschfeld (Germany, 1840–1896)
Azahari Siti Nur Fatimah Hj (Brunei, born 1992)
 Jóhann Hjartarson (Iceland, born 1963)
 Hoang Thanh Trang (Vietnam, Hungary, born 1980)
 Albert Hodges (US, 1861–1944)
 Julian Hodgson (England, born 1963)
 Leopold Hoffer (Hungary, France, England, 1842–1913)
 Karl Holländer (Germany, 1868–? )
 Edith Holloway (England, 1868–1956)
 Krystyna Hołuj-Radzikowska (Poland, 1931–2006)
 Walther von Holzhausen (Austria, Germany, 1876–1935)
 Baldur Hönlinger (Austria, Germany, 1905–1990)
 Bill Hook (US, British Virgin Islands, 1925–2010)
 Vlastimil Hort (Czechoslovakia, Germany, born 1944)
 Israel Horowitz (US, 1907–1973)
 Bernhard Horwitz (Germany, England, 1807–1885)
 Henry Hosmer (US, 1837–1892)
 Enamul Hossain (Bangladesh, born 1981)
 Hou Yifan (China, born 1994)
 Jovanka Houska (England, born 1980)
 Clarence Howell (US, 1881–1936)
 David Howell (England, born 1990)
 James Howell (England, born 1967)
 Zbyněk Hráček (Czech Republic, born 1970)
 Karel Hromádka (Bohemia, Czechoslovakia, 1887–1956)
 Vincenz Hruby (Bohemia, Austria, Italy, 1856–1917)
 Hsu Li Yang (Singapore, born 1972)
 Huang Qian (China, born 1986)
 Robert Hübner (Germany, born 1948)
 Werner Hug (Switzerland, born 1952)
 Krunoslav Hulak (Croatia, 1951–2015)
 Koneru Humpy (India, born 1987)
 Harriet Hunt (England, born 1978)
 Alexander Huzman (Ukraine, Israel, born 1962)

I 
 Ildar Ibragimov (Russia, US, born 1967)
 Bella Igla (Russia, Israel, born 1985)
 Juan Iliesco (Romania, Argentina, 1898–1968)
 Rolando Illa (US, Cuba, Argentina, 1880–1937)
 Miguel Illescas Córdoba (Spain, born 1965)
 Alexander Ilyin-Zhenevsky (Russia, 1894–1941)
 Ernesto Inarkiev (Kyrgyzstan, Russia, born 1985)
 Viorel Iordăchescu (Moldova, born 1977)
 Nana Ioseliani (Georgia, born 1962)
 Alexander Ipatov (Ukraine, Spain, Turkey, born 1993)
 Andrei Istrățescu (Romania, born 1985)
 Saidali Iuldachev (Uzbekistan, born 1968)
 Vassily Ivanchuk (Ukraine, born 1969)
 Ivan Ivanišević (Serbia, born 1977)
 Alexander Ivanov (US, born 1956)
 Igor Ivanov (Russia, Canada, US, 1947–2005)
 Božidar Ivanović (Montenegro, born 1949)
 Borislav Ivkov (Serbia, born 1933)
 Stefan Izbinsky (Ukraine, 1884–1912)
 Zviad Izoria (Georgia, born 1984)

J 
 Jana Jacková (Czech Republic, born 1982)
 Egil Jacobsen (Denmark, 1897–1923)
 Ernst Jacobson (Sweden, ?–?)
 Carl Jaenisch (Finland, Russia, 1813–1872)
 Charles Jaffe (Russia, US, 1883–1941)
 Jerzy Jagielski (Poland, Germany, 1897–1955)
 Dmitry Jakovenko (Russia, born 1983)
 Lora Jakovleva (Russia, born 1932)
 Dragoljub Janošević (Serbia, 1923–1993)
 Chaim Janowski (Poland, Germany, Japan, c.1868–1935)
 Dawid Janowski (Poland, France, 1868–1927)
 Vlastimil Jansa (Czech Republic, born 1942)
 Nicolai Jasnogrodsky (Ukraine, England, US, 1859–1914)
 Carlos Jáuregui (Chile, Canada, 1932–2013)
 Florian Jenni (Switzerland, born 1980)
 Eleazar Jiménez (Cuba, 1928–2000)
 Baadur Jobava (Georgia, born 1983)
 Leif Erlend Johannessen (Norway, born 1980)
 Svein Johannessen (Norway, 1937–2007)
 Darryl Johansen (Australia, born 1959)
 Walter John (Poland, Germany, 1879–1940)
 Hans Johner (Switzerland, 1889–1975)
 Paul Johner (Switzerland, 1887–1938)
 Gawain Jones (England, born 1987)
 Iolo Jones (Wales, 1947–2021)
 Paul Journoud (France, 1821–1882)
 Ju Wenjun (China, born 1991)
 Max Judd (Poland, US, 1851–1906)
 Klaus Junge (Chile, Germany, 1924–1945)
 Otto Junge (Chile, Germany, 1887–1978)
 Miervaldis Jurševskis (Latvia, Canada, 1921–2014)

K 
 Bernhard Kagan (Poland, Germany, 1866–1932)
 Shimon Kagan (Israel, born 1942)
 Victor Kahn (Russia, France, 1889–1971)
 Gregory Kaidanov (Ukraine, Russia, US, born 1959)
 Osmo Kaila (Finland, 1916–1991)
 Charles Kalme (Latvia, Germany, US, 1939–2003)
 Gata Kamsky (Russia, US, born 1974)
 Ilya Kan (Russia, 1909–1978)
 Marcus Kann (Austria, 1820–1886)
 Albert Kapengut (Belarus, US, born 1944)
 Julio Kaplan (Argentina, Puerto Rico, US, born 1950)
 Darja Kapš (Slovenia, born 1981)
 Mona May Karff (Moldova, Russia, Palestine, US, 1914–1998)
 Sergey Karjakin (Ukraine, born 1990)
 Anastasiya Karlovich (Ukraine, born 1982)
 Anatoly Karpov (Russia, born 1951)
 Isaac Kashdan (US, 1905–1985)
 Rustam Kasimdzhanov (Uzbekistan, born 1979)
 Garry Kasparov (Azerbaijan, Russia, born 1963)
 Genrikh Kasparyan (Armenia, 1910–1995)
 Miroslav Katětov (Czechoslovakia, 1918–1995)
 Arthur Kaufmann (Romania, Austria, 1872–1940)
 Lubomir Kavalek (Czechoslovakia, US, 1943–2021)
 Raymond Keene (England, born 1948)
 Hermann Keidanski (Poland, Germany, 1865–1938)
 Dieter Keller (Switzerland, born 1936)
 Edith Keller-Herrmann (Germany, 1921–2010)
 Rudolf Keller (Germany, 1917–1993)
 Brian Kelly (Ireland, born 1978)
 Emil Kemény (Hungary, US, 1860–1925)
 Edvīns Ķeņģis (Latvia, born 1959)
 Hugh Alexander Kennedy (Ireland, England, 1809–1878)
 Paul Keres (Estonia, 1916–1975)
 Alexander Kevitz (US, 1902–1981)
 Rohini Khadilkar (India, born 1963)
 Alexander Khalifman (Russia, born 1966)
 Mir Sultan Khan (India, Pakistan, 1905–1966)
 Andrei Kharlov (Russia, 1968–2014)
 Murtas Kazhgaleyev (Kazakhstan, born 1973)
 Abram Khavin (Ukraine, 1914–1974)
 Igor Khenkin (Russia, Germany, born 1968)
 Denis Khismatullin (Russia, born 1984)
 Ratmir Kholmov (Russia, Belarus, Lithuania, 1925–2006)
 Natalia Khoudgarian (Russia, Canada, born 1975)
 Nino Khurtsidze (Georgia, 1975–2018)
 Feliks Kibbermann (Estonia, 1902–1993)
 Georg Kieninger (Germany, 1902–1975)
 Lionel Kieseritzky (Estonia, France, 1806–1853)
 R.K. Kieseritzky (Estonia, Russia, c. 1870 – after 1922)
 Daniel King (England, born 1963)
 Olof Kinnmark (Sweden, 1897–1970)
 Ove Kinnmark (Sweden, 1944–2015)
 Georg Klaus (Germany, 1912–1974)
 Jan Kleczyński Jr. (Poland, 1875–1939)
 Jan Kleczyński Sr. (Poland, 1837–1895)
 Ernst Klein (Austria, England, 1910–1990)
 Paul Klein (Germany, Ecuador, 1915–1992)
 Josef Kling (Germany, 1811–1876)
 Jānis Klovāns (Latvia, 1935–2010)
 Gyula Kluger (Hungary, 1914–1994)
 Hans Kmoch (Austria, Netherlands, US, 1894–1973)
 Rainer Knaak (Germany, born 1953)
 Viktor Knorre (Russia, 1840–1919)
 Mikhail Kobalia (Russia, born 1978)
 Alexander Koblencs (Latvia, 1916–1993)
 Berthold Koch (Germany, 1899–1988)
 Alexander Kochyev (Russia, born 1956)
 Artur Kogan (Ukraine, Israel, born 1974)
 Boris Kogan (Russia, US, 1940–1993)
 Anton Kohler (Germany, c. 1907–1961)
 Stanisław Kohn (Poland, 1895–1940)
 Friedrich Köhnlein (Germany, 1879–1916)
 Dmitry Kokarev (Russia, born 1982)
 Atanas Kolev (Bulgaria, born 1967)
 Ignác Kolisch (Slovakia, Austria-Hungary, 1837–1899)
 Jakub Kolski (Poland, 1899–1941)
 Georges Koltanowski (Belgium, US, 1903–2000)
 Henrijeta Konarkowska-Sokolov (Poland, Serbia, born 1938)
 Humpy Koneru (India, born 1987)
 Imre König (Hungary, Yugoslavia, England, US, 1899–1992)
 Jerzy Konikowski (Poland, Germany, born 1947)
 Alexander Konstantinopolsky (Ukraine, 1910–1990)
 Danny Kopec (US, 1954–2016)
 Viktor Korchnoi (Russia, Switzerland, 1931–2016)
 Akshayraj Kore (India 1988)
 Anton Korobov (Ukraine, born 1985)
 Imre Korody (Hungary, 1905–1969)
 Alexey Korotylev (Russia, born 1977)
 Yona Kosashvili (Georgia, Israel, born 1970)
 Gary Koshnitsky (Moldova, Australia, 1907–1999)
 Nadezhda Kosintseva (Russia, born 1985)
 Tatiana Kosintseva (Russia, born 1986)
 Alexandra Kosteniuk (Russia, born 1984)
 Boris Kostić (Austria-Hungary, Yugoslavia, 1887–1963)
 Jan Kotrč (Czechoslovakia, 1862–1943)
 Vasilios Kotronias (Greece, born 1964)
 Pavel Kotsur (Kazakhstan, born 1974)
 Alexander Kotov (Russia, 1913–1981)
 Čeněk Kottnauer (Czechoslovakia, England, 1910–1996)
 Bachar Kouatly (Syria, Liban, France, born 1958)
 Vlatko Kovačević (Croatia, born 1942)
 Alexander Kovchan (Ukraine, born 1983)
 Boris Koyalovich (Russia, 1867–1941)
 Valentina Kozlovskaya (Russia, born 1938)
 Zdenko Kožul (Croatia, born 1966)
 Jesse Kraai (US, born 1972)
 Yair Kraidman (Israel, born 1932)
 Adolf Kraemer (Germany, 1898–1972)
 Adolf Kramer (Germany, 1871–1934)
 Haije Kramer (Netherlands, 1917–2004)
 Vladimir Kramnik (Russia, born 1975)
 Michał Krasenkow (Russia, Poland, born 1963)
 Orla Hermann Krause (Denmark, 1867–1935)
 Martyn Kravtsiv (Ukraine, born 1990)
 Boris Kreiman (Russia, US, born 1976)
 Josef Krejcik (Austria, 1885–1957)
 Leon Kremer (Poland, 1901–1941)
 Martin Kreuzer (Germany, born 1962)
 Ljuba Kristol (Russia, Israel, born 1944)
 Stanislav Kriventsov (Russia, US, born 1973)
 Nikolai Krogius (Russia, born 1930)
 Paul Krüger (Germany, 1871–1939)
 Irina Krush (Ukraine, US, born 1983)
 Yuriy Kryvoruchko (Ukraine, born 1986)
 Arvid Kubbel (Russia, 1889–1938)
 Leonid Kubbel (Russia, 1891–1942)
 Sergey Kudrin (Russia, US, born 1959)
 Adam Kuligowski (Poland, born 1955)
 Kaido Külaots (Estonia, born 1976)
 Abhijit Kunte (India, born 1977)
 Abraham Kupchik (Belarus, US, 1892–1970)
 Viktor Kupreichik (Belarus, 1949–2017)
 Bojan Kurajica (Bosnia and Herzegovina, born 1947)
 Igor Kurnosov (Russia, 1985–2013)
 Alla Kushnir (Russia, Israel, 1941–2013)
 Gennady Kuzmin (Russia, 1946–2020)
 Yuriy Kuzubov (Ukraine, born 1990)
 Jan Kvicala (Czechoslovakia, 1868–1939)

L 
 Kateryna Lahno (Ukraine, born 1989)
 Bogdan Lalić (Yugoslavia/Croatia, England, born 1964)
 Erwin l'Ami (Netherlands, born 1985)
 Frank Lamprecht (Germany, born 1968)
 Konstantin Landa (Russia, 1972–2022)
 Salo Landau (Poland, Netherlands, 1903–1944)
 Gary Lane (England, Australia, born 1964)
 Lisa Lane (US, born 1938)
 Max Lange (Germany, 1832–1899)
 Salomon Langleben (Poland, 1862–1939)
 Bent Larsen (Denmark, 1935–2010)
 Ernst Larsson (Sweden, 1897–1963)
 Baron Tassilo von Heydebrand und der Lasa (Prussia/Germany, 1818–1899)
 Berthold Lasker (Germany, 1860–1928)
 Edward Lasker (Poland, Germany, US, 1885–1981)
 Emanuel Lasker (Germany, Russia, US, 1868–1941)
 Milda Lauberte (Latvia, 1918–2009)
 Leho Laurine (Estonia, Sweden, 1904–1998)
 Jessica Lauser (American)
 Joël Lautier (Canada, France, born 1973)
 Darwin Laylo (Philippines, born 1980)
 Frédéric Lazard (France, 1883–1948)
 Gustave Lazard (France, 1876–1949)
 Milunka Lazarević (Serbia, 1932–2018)
 Viktor Láznička (Czech Republic, born 1988)
 Lê Quang Liêm (Vietnam, born 1991)
 Sergey Lebedev (Russia, 1868–1942)
 Peter Lee (England, born 1943)
 Peter Leepin (Switzerland, 1920–1995)
 Legall de Kermeur (France, 1702–1792)
 Anatoly Lein (Russia, US, 1931–2018)
 Péter Lékó (Hungary, born 1979)
 Giovanni Leonardo (Italy, 1542–1587)
 Paul Saladin Leonhardt (Poland, Germany, 1877–1934)
 Alex Lenderman (US, born 1989)
 James A. Leonard (US, 1841–1862)
 Konstantin Lerner (Ukraine, 1950–2011)
 Jean-Pierre Le Roux (France, born 1982)
 Alexandre Lesiège (Canada, born 1975)
 Norman Lessing (US, 1911–2001)
 René Letelier (Chile, 1915–2006)
 Grigory Levenfish (Poland, Russia, 1889–1961)
 Alexander Levin (Russia, 1871–1929)
 Jacob Levin (US, 1904–1992)
 Naum Levin (Ukraine, Australia, born 1933)
 Irina Levitina (Russia, US, born 1954)
 Stepan Levitsky (Russia, 1876–1924)
 David Levy (Scotland, born 1945)
 Jerzy Lewi (Poland, Sweden, 1949–1972)
 Moritz Lewitt (Germany, 1863–1936)
 Li Chao (China, born 1989)
 Li Ruofan (Singapore, born 1978)
 Li Shilong (China, born 1977)
 Li Shongjian (China, born 1939)
 Li Wenliang (China, born 1967)
 Li Zunian (China, born 1958)
 Liang Chong (China, born 1980)
 Liang Jinrong (China, born 1960)
 Vladimir Liberzon (Russia, Israel, 1937–1996)
 Theodor Lichtenhein (Germany, US, 1829–1874)
 Espen Lie (Norway, born 1984)
 Kjetil Aleksander Lie (Norway, born 1980)
 Andor Lilienthal (Hungary, Russia, 1911–2010)
 Darcy Lima (Brazil, born 1962)
 Lin Ta (China, born 1963)
 Lin Weiguo (China, born 1970)
 Paul Lipke (Germany, 1870–1955)
 Isaac Lipnitsky (Ukraine, 1923–1959)
 Samuel Lipschütz (Hungary, US, 1863–1905)
 Georgy Lisitsin (Russia, 1909–1972)
 Paul List (Ukraine, Germany, England, 1887–1954)
 Marta Litinskaya-Shul (Ukraine, born 1949)
 John Littlewood (England, 1931–2009)
 Liu Shilan (China, born 1962)
 Liu Wenzhe (China, 1940–2010)
 Ljubomir Ljubojević (Serbia, born 1950)
 Eric Lobron (US, Germany, born 1960)
 Josef Lokvenc (Austria, 1899–1974)
 Giambattista Lolli (Italy, 1698–1769)
 Rudolf Loman (Netherlands, 1861–1932)
 William Lombardy (US, 1937–2017)
 Ruy López de Segura (Spain, c. 1530 – c. 1580)
 Edward Löwe (England, 1794–1880)
 Otto Löwenborg (Sweden, 1888–1969)
 Johann Löwenthal (Hungary, England, 1810–1876)
 Leopold Löwy, Jr (Austria, 1871–after 1909)
 Leopold Löwy, Sr (Austria, 1840–after 1904)
 Moishe Lowtzky (Ukraine, Poland, 1881–1940)
 Sam Loyd (US, 1841–1911)
 Smbat Lputian (Armenia, born 1958)
 Luis Ramirez Lucena (Spain, c. 1465 – c. 1530)
 Markas Luckis (Lithuania, Argentina, 1905–1973)
 Andrey Lukin (Russia, born 1948)
 Stig Lundholm (Sweden, 1917–2009)
 Erik Lundin (Sweden, 1904–1988)
 Francisco Lupi (Portugal, before 1910–1954)
 Constantin Lupulescu (Romania, born 1984)
 Thomas Luther (Germany, born 1969)
 Christopher Lutz (Germany, born 1971)

M 
 Gottlieb Machate (Germany, 1904–1974)
 Aleksandras Machtas (Lithuania, Israel, 1892–1973)
 Bartłomiej Macieja (Poland, born 1977)
 George Henry Mackenzie (Scotland, US, 1837–1891)
 Nicholas MacLeod (Canada, 1870–1965)
 Carlos Maderna (Argentina, 1910–1976)
 Ildikó Mádl (Hungary, born 1969)
 Elmar Magerramov (Azerbaijan, born 1958)
 Joanna Majdan (Poland, born 1988)
 Kazimierz Makarczyk (Poland, 1901–1972)
 Vladimir Makogonov (Azerbaijan, 1904–1993)
 Gyula Makovetz (Hungary, 1860–1903)
 Vadim Malakhatko (Ukraine, Belgium, born 1977)
 Vladimir Malakhov (Russia, born 1980)
 Vidmantas Mališauskas (Lithuania, born 1963)
 Vladimir Malaniuk (Russia, Ukraine, 1957–2017)
 Boris Maliutin (Russia, 1883–1920)
 Nidjat Mamedov (Azerbaijan, born 1985)
 Shakhriyar Mamedyarov (Azerbaijan, born 1985)
 Rauf Mamedov (Azerbaijan, born 1988)
 Maria Manakova (Serbia, born 1974)
 Karmen Mar (Slovenia, born 1987)
 Napoleon Marache (France, US, 1818–1875)
 Max Marchand (Netherlands, 1888–1957)
 Georg Marco (Romania, Austria, 1863–1923)
 Alisa Marić (Serbia, born 1970)
 Mirjana Marić (Serbia, born 1970)
 Mihail Marin (Romania, born 1965)
 Beatriz Marinello (Chile, born 1964)
 Sergio Mariotti (Italy, born 1946)
 Ján Markoš (Slovakia, born 1985)
 Tomasz Markowski (Poland, born 1975)
 Robert Markuš (Serbia, born 1984)
 Géza Maróczy (Hungary, 1870–1951)
 Davide Marotti (Italy, 1881–1940)
 Dražen Marović (Croatia, born 1938)
 Frank Marshall (US, 1877–1944)
 Dion Martinez (Cuba, US, 1837–1928)
 Giovanni Martinolich (Italy, 1884–1910)
 Rico Mascariñas (Philippines, born 1953)
 Houshang Mashian (Iran, Israel, born 1938)
 James Mason (Ireland, US, England, 1849–1905)
 Dimitrios Mastrovasilis (Greece, born 1983)
 Aleksandar Matanović (Serbia, born 1930)
 Hermanis Matisons (Latvia, 1894–1932)
 Milan Matulović (Serbia, 1935–2013)
 Svetlana Matveeva (Russia, born 1969)
 Carl Mayet (Germany, 1810–1868)
 Isaak Mazel (Belarus, Russia, 1911–1943)
 Neil McDonald (England, born 1967)
 Alexander McDonnell (Ireland, 1798–1835)
 Colin McNab (Scotland, born 1961)
 Luke McShane (England, born 1984)
 Henrique Mecking (Brazil, born 1952)
 Antonio Medina (Spain, 1919–2003)
 Edmar Mednis (Latvia, US, 1937–2002)
 Susanto Megaranto (Indonesia, born 1987)
 Philipp Meitner (Austria, 1838–1910)
 Hrant Melkumyan (Armenia, born 1989)
 Olga Menchik (Russia, Czechoslovakia, England, 1908–1944)
 Vera Menchik (Russia, Czechoslovakia, England, 1906–1944)
 Julius Mendheim (Germany, 1788–1836)
 Jonathan Mestel (England, born 1957)
 Johannes Metger (Germany, 1850–1926)
 Voldemārs Mežgailis (Latvia, 1912–1998)
 Paul Michel (Germany, Argentina, 1905–1977)
 Walter Michel (Switzerland, 1888–after 1935)
 Reginald Pryce Michell (England, 1873–1938)
 Jacques Mieses (Germany, England, 1865–1954)
 Samuel Mieses (Germany, 1841–1884)
 Vladas Mikėnas (Estonia, Lithuania, 1910–1992)
 Adrian Mikhalchishin (Ukraine, Slovenia, born 1954)
 Victor Mikhalevski (Belarus, Israel, born 1972)
 Igor Miladinović (Serbia, born 1974)
 Tony Miles (England, 1955–2001)
 Zdravko Milev (Bulgaria, 1929–1984)
 Borislav Milić (Yugoslavia, 1925–1986)
 Sophie Milliet (France, born 1983)
 Stuart Milner-Barry (England, 1906–1995)
 Vadim Milov (Russia, Israel, Switzerland, born 1972)
 Artashes Minasian (Armenia, born 1987)
 Johannes Minckwitz (Germany, 1843–1901)
 Nikolay Minev (Bulgaria, US, 1931–2017)
 Dragoljub Minić (Montenegro, 1936–2005)
 Evgenij Miroshnichenko (Ukraine, born 1978)
 Azer Mirzoev (Azerbaijan, born 1978)
 Vesna Mišanović (Bosnia, born 1964)
 Abhimanyu Mishra (US, born 2009)
 Kamil Mitoń (Poland, born 1984)
 Jack Mizzi (Malta, born 2006)
 Lilit Mkrtchian (Armenia, born 1982)
 Stasch Mlotkowski (US, 1881–1943)
 Abram Model (Latvia, Russia, 1896–1976)
 Charles Moehle (US, 1859–1898)
 Ariah Mohiliver (Poland, Israel, 1904–1996)
 Stefan Mohr (Germany, born 1967)
 Alexander Moiseenko (Ukraine, born 1980)
 Baldur Möller (Iceland, 1914–1999)
 Jørgen Møller (Denmark, 1873–1944)
 Augustus Mongredien (England, 1807–1888)
 Léon Monosson (Belarus, France, 1892–1943)
 Julius du Mont (France, England, 1881–1956)
 Mario Monticelli (Italy, 1902–1995)
 María Teresa Mora (Cuba, 1902–1980)
 Elshan Moradi (Iran, born 1985)
 Luciana Morales Mendoza (Peru, born 1987)
 Kalikst Morawski (Poland, 1859 – c. 1939)
 Bruno Moritz (Germany, Ecuador, 1898–?)
 Iván Morovic (Chile, born 1963)
 Alexander Moroz (Ukraine, 1961–2009)
 Alexander Morozevich (Russia, born 1977)
 Paul Morphy (US, 1837–1884)
 John Morrison (Canada, 1889–1975)
 Paul Motwani (Scotland, born 1962)
 Alexander Motylev (Russia, born 1979)
 Sergei Movsesian (Armenia, Slovakia, born 1978)
 Paul Mross (Poland, Germany, 1910–1991)
 Martin Mrva (Slovakia, born 1971)
 André Muffang (France, 1897–1989)
 Hans Müller (Austria, 1896–1971)
 Karsten Müller (Germany, born 1970)
 César Muñoz (Ecuador, 1929–2000)
 Piotr Murdzia (Poland, born 1975)
 Jacob Murey (Russia, Israel, born 1941)
 Augusto de Muro (Argentina, ? –1959)
 Niaz Murshed (Bangladesh, born 1966)
 Phiona Mutesi (Uganda, birthdate unknown)
 Anna Muzychuk (Ukraine, Slovenia, born 1990)
 Mariya Muzychuk (Ukraine, born 1992)
 Lhamsuren Myagmarsuren (Mongolia, born 1938)
 Hugh Myers (US, 1930–2008)

N 
 Ashot Nadanian (Armenia, born 1972)
 Arkadij Naiditsch (Latvia, Germany, born 1985)
 Oskar Naegeli (Switzerland, 1885–1959)
 Géza Nagy (Hungary, 1892–1953)
 Miguel Najdorf (Poland, Argentina, 1910–1997)
 Hikaru Nakamura (Japan, US, born 1987)
 William Napier (England, US, 1881–1952)
 Mario Napolitano (Italy, 1910–1995)
 Renato Naranja (Philippines, born 1940)
 Srinath Narayanan (India, born 1994)
 Daniel Naroditsky (US, born 1995)
 David Navara (Czech Republic, born 1985)
 Vera Nebolsina (Russia, born 1989)
 Ozren Nedeljković (Serbia, 1903–1984)
 Gastón Needleman (Argentina, born 1990)
 Parimarjan Negi (India, born 1993)
 Iivo Nei (Estonia, born 1931)
 Oleg Neikirch (Georgia, Bulgaria, 1914–1985)
 Kateřina Němcová (Czech Republic, born 1990)
 Vladimir Nenarokov (Russia, 1880–1953)
 Ian Nepomniachtchi (Russia, born 1990)
 Vincenzo Nestler (Italy, 1912–1988)
 Augustin Neumann (Austria, 1879–1906)
 Gustav Neumann (Germany, 1838–1881)
 Vladislav Nevednichy (Romania, born 1969)
 Valeriy Neverov (Ukraine, born 1962)
 Rashid Nezhmetdinov (Russia, 1912–1974)
 Ni Hua (China, born 1983)
 Arno Nickel (Germany, born 1952)
 Bryon Nickoloff (Canada, 1956–2004)
 Bjørn Nielsen (Denmark, 1907–1949)
 Peter Heine Nielsen (Denmark, born 1973)
 Torkil Nielsen (Faroe Islands, born 1964)
 Hans Niemann (US, born 2003)
 Walter Niephaus (Germany, 1923–1992)
 Aleksandr Nikitin (Russia, 1935–2022)
 Yuri Nikolaevsky (Ukraine, 1937–2004)
 Ioannis Nikolaidis (Greece, born 1971)
 Predrag Nikolić (Bosnia and Herzegovina, born 1960)
 Allan Nilsson (Sweden, 1899–1949)
 Aron Nimzowitsch (Latvia, Denmark, 1886–1935)
 Ning Chunhong (China, born 1968)
 Liviu-Dieter Nisipeanu (Romania, born 1976)
 Josef Noa (Hungary, 1856–1903)
 Jesús Nogueiras (Cuba, born 1959)
 Federico Norcia (Italy, 1904–1985)
 Holger Norman-Hansen (Denmark, 1899–1984)
 David Norwood (England, born 1968)
 Daniël Noteboom (Netherlands, 1910–1932)
 Igor Novikov (Ukraine, US, born 1962)
 Nikolay Novotelnov (Russia, 1911–2006)
 Heinz Nowarra (Germany, 1897–c. 1945)
 John Nunn (England, born 1955)
 Friedrich Nürnberg (Germany, 1909–1984)
 Tomi Nybäck (Finland, born 1985)
 Gustaf Nyholm (Sweden, 1880–1957)
 Illia Nyzhnyk (Ukraine, born 1996)

O 
 Kevin O'Connell (England, Ireland, born 1949)
 Handszar Odeev (Turkmenistan, born 1972)
 Leif Øgaard (Norway, born 1952)
 John O'Hanlon (Ireland, 1876–1960)
 Tõnu Õim (Estonia, born 1941)
 Kaarle Ojanen (Finland, 1918–2009)
 Albéric O'Kelly de Galway (Belgium, 1911–1980)
 Friðrik Ólafsson (Iceland, born 1935)
 Helgi Ólafsson (Iceland, born 1956)
 Mikhailo Oleksienko (Ukraine, born 1986)
 Lembit Oll (Estonia, 1966–1999)
 Adolf Georg Olland (Netherlands, 1867–1933)
 Anton Olson (Sweden, 1881–after 1928)
 Alexander Onischuk (Ukraine, US born 1975)
 Karel Opočenský (Czechoslovakia, 1892–1975)
 Wilhelm Orbach (Germany, 1894–1944)
 Menachem Oren (Poland, Israel, 1901–1962)
 Gerard Oskam (Netherlands, 1880–1952)
 Berge Østenstad (Norway, born 1964)
 John Owen (England, 1827–1901)
 Karlis Ozols (Latvia, Australia, 1912–2001)

P 
 Luděk Pachman (Czechoslovakia, Germany, 1924–2003)
 Nikola Padevsky (Bulgaria, born 1933)
 Elisabeth Pähtz (Germany, born 1985)
 Mladen Palac (Croatia, born 1971)
 Sam Palatnik (Ukraine, US, born 1950)
 Luis Palau (Argentina, 1897–1971)
 Victor Palciauskas (Lithuania, US, born 1941)
 Richard Palliser (England, born 1981)
 Rudolf Palme (Austria, 1910–2005)
 Ryan Palmer (Jamaica, born 1974)
 Davor Palo (Denmark, born 1985)
 Eero Paloheimo (Finland, born 1936)
 Oscar Panno (Argentina, born 1935)
 Vasily Panov (Russia, 1906–1973)
 Mark Paragua (Philippines, born 1984)
 Bernard Parham (US, born 1946)
 Shadi Paridar (Iran, born 1986)
 Mircea Pârligras (Romania, born 1980)
 Bruno Parma (Slovenia, born 1941)
 Frank Parr (England, 1918–2003)
 Louis Paulsen (Germany, 1833–1891)
 Wilfried Paulsen (Germany, 1828–1901)
 Duško Pavasovič (Croatia, Slovenia, born 1975)
 Max Pavey (US, 1918–1957)
 Jiří Pelikán (Czechoslovakia, Argentina, 1906–1985)
 Yannick Pelletier (Switzerland, born 1976)
 Roman Pelts (Ukraine, Canada, born 1937)
 Peng Xiaomin (China, born 1973)
 Peng Zhaoqin (China, born 1968)
 Jonathan Penrose (England, 1933–2021)
 Corina Peptan (Romania, born 1978)
 Julius Perlis (Poland, Austria, 1880–1913)
 Frederick Perrin (England, US, 1815–1889)
 Raaphi Persitz (England, Israel, Switzerland, 1934–2009)
 Nick Pert (England, born 1981)
 John Peters (US, born 1951)
 Jusefs Petkevich (Latvia, born 1940)
 Arshak Petrosian (Armenia, born 1953)
 Davit G. Petrosian (Armenia, born 1984)
 Tigran Petrosian (Armenia, Georgia, USSR, 1929–1984)
 Alexander Petrov (Russia, 1794–1867)
 Vladimirs Petrovs (Latvia, 1907–1943)
 Gerhard Pfeiffer (Germany, 1923–2000)
 Helmut Pfleger (Germany, born 1943)
 François-André Danican Philidor (France, 1726–1795)
 Luis Piazzini (Argentina, 1905–1980)
 Jeroen Piket (Netherlands, born 1969)
 Harry Nelson Pillsbury (US, 1872–1906)
 Hermann Pilnik (Germany, Argentina, 1914–1981)
 Karol Piltz (Poland, 1903–1939)
 Albert Pinkus (US, 1903–1984)
 József Pintér (Hungary, born 1953)
 Vasja Pirc (Slovenia, 1907–1980)
 Rudolf Pitschak (Czechoslovakia, US, 1902–1988)
 Karl Pitschel (Austria, 1829–1883)
 Aaron Pixton (US, born 1986)
 Ján Plachetka (Slovakia, born 1945)
 Albin Planinc (Slovenia, 1944–2008)
 James Plaskett (England, Spain, born 1960)
 Kazimierz Plater (Poland, 1915–2004)
 Igor Platonov (Ukraine, 1934–1995)
 Joseph Platz (Germany, US, 1905–1981)
 Isaías Pleci (Argentina, 1907–1979)
 David Podhorzer (Austria, 1907–1998)
 Natalia Pogonina (Russia, born 1985)
 Henryk Pogorieły (Poland, 1908–1943)
 Ernest Pogosyants (Ukraine, 1935–1990)
 Iosif Pogrebyssky (Ukraine, 1906–1971)
 Amos Pokorný (Czechoslovakia, 1890–1949)
 Rudolph Pokorny (Bohemia, Mexico, US, 1880–after 1920)
 Giulio Polerio (Italy, 1548–1612)
 Judit Polgár (Hungary, born 1976)
 Zsuzsa Polgar (Hungary, US, born 1969)
 Zsofia Polgar (Hungary, Israel, born 1974)
 Elisabeta Polihroniade (Romania, 1935–2016)
 David Polland (US, born 1915)
 William Pollock (United Kingdom, 1859–1896)
 Lev Polugaevsky (Belarus, Russia, 1934–1995)
 Arturo Pomar (Spain, 1931–2016)
 Ruslan Ponomariov (Ukraine, 1983)
 Domenico Ponziani (Italy, 1719–1796)
 Stepan Popel (Poland, France, US, 1909–1987)
 Ignatz von Popiel (Austria-Hungary, Poland, 1863–1941)
 Petar Popović (Yugoslavia, Serbia, born 1959)
 Artur Popławski (Poland, Switzerland, 1860–1918)
 Yosef Porat (Germany, Israel, 1909–1996)
 Moritz Porges (Bohemia/Austria-Hungary, 1857–1909)
 Lajos Portisch (Hungary, born 1937)
 Ehrhardt Post (Germany, 1881–1947)
 Evgeny Postny (Israel, born 1981)
 Peter Potemkine (Russia, France, 1886–1926)
 Vladimir Potkin (Russia, born 1982)
 Ludovit Potuček (Slovakia, 1912–1982)
 Christian Poulsen (Denmark, 1912–1981)
 Atousa Pourkashiyan (Iran, born 1988)
 Borki Predojević (Bosnia, born 1987)
 Edith Charlotte Price (England, 1872–1952)
 Lodewijk Prins (Netherlands, 1913–1999)
 Svetlana Prudnikova (Russia, born 1967)
 Dawid Przepiórka (Poland, 1880–1942)
 Lev Psakhis (Russia, Israel, born 1958)
 Lenka Ptáčníková (Czechoslovakia, Iceland, born 1976)
 Stojan Puc (Slovenia, 1921–2004)
 Viktors Pupols (Latvia, US, born 1934)
 Cecil Purdy (New Zealand, Australia, 1906–1979)
 John Purdy (Australia, 1935–2011)

Q 
 Qi Jingxuan (China, born 1947)
 Qin Kanying (China, born 1974)
 Oscar Quiñones (Peru, born 1941)
 Miguel Quinteros (Argentina, born 1947)

R 
 Braslav Rabar (Croatia, 1919–1973)
 Abram Rabinovich (Lithuania, Russia, 1878–1943)
 Ilya Rabinovich (Russia, 1891–1942)
 Teimour Radjabov (Azerbaijan, born 1987)
 Ivan Radulov (Bulgaria, born 1939)
 Markus Ragger (Austria, born 1988)
 Viacheslav Ragozin (Russia, 1908–1962)
 Ziaur Rahman (Bangladesh, born 1974)
 Maurice Raizman (Moldova/Russia, France 1905–1974)
 Iweta Rajlich (Poland, born 1981)
 Ramachandran Ramesh (India, born 1976)
 Alejandro Ramírez (Costa Rica, born 1988)
 Richárd Rapport (Hungary, born 1996)
 Nukhim Rashkovsky (Russia, born 1946)
 Ilmar Raud (Estonia, Argentina, 1913–1941)
 Vsevolod Rauzer (Ukraine, 1908–1941)
 Yuri Razuvayev (Russia, 1945–2012)
 Damian Reca (Argentina, 1894–1937)
 Hans Ree (Netherlands, born 1944)
 Brian Reilly (France, England, Ireland, 1901–1991)
 Dimitri Reinderman (Netherlands, born 1972)
 Fred Reinfeld (US, 1910–1964)
 Heinrich Reinhardt (Germany, Argentina, 1903–1990)
 Salome Reischer (Austria, Palestine, US, 1899–1980)
 Teodor Regedziński (Poland, 1894–1954)
 Arturo Reggio (Italy, 1863–1917)
 Josef Rejfíř (Czechoslovakia, 1909–1962)
 Ludwig Rellstab (Germany, 1904–1983)
 Georges Renaud (France, 1893–1975)
 Samuel Reshevsky (Poland, US, 1911–1992)
 Pál Réthy (Hungary, 1905–1962)
 Richard Réti (Austria-Hungary, Czechoslovakia, 1889–1929)
 Ramón Rey Ardid (Spain, 1903–1988)
 Alexander Riazantsev (Russia, born 1985)
 Zoltán Ribli (Hungary, born 1951)
 Pablo Ricardi (Argentina, born 1962)
 Isaac Rice (US, 1850–1915)
 Kurt Richter (Germany, 1900–1969)
 Antonio Rico (Spain, 1908–1988)
 Alessandra Riegler (Italy, born 1961)
 Fritz Riemann (Germany, 1859–1932)
 Friedl Rinder (Germany, 1905–2001)
 Horst Rittner (Germany, 1930–2021)
 Nikolai Riumin (Russia, 1908–1942)
 Jules Arnous de Rivière (France, 1830–1905)
 Karl Robatsch (Austria, 1928–2000)
 Walter Robinow (Germany, 1867–1938)
 Ray Robson (US, born 1994)
 Ludwig Rödl (Germany, 1907–1970)
 Maxim Rodshtein (Israel, born 1989)
 Hans Roepstorff (Germany, 1910–1945)
 Ian Rogers (Australia, born 1960)
 Gustav Rogmann (Germany, 1909–1947)
 Kenneth Rogoff (US, born 1953)
 Dorian Rogozenko (Romania, born 1973)
 Ivan Vladimir Rohaček (Slovakia, 1909–1977)
 Michael Rohde (US, born 1959)
 Michael Roiz (Russia, Israel born 1983)
 Oleg Romanishin (Ukraine, born 1952)
 Alexander Romanovsky (Lithuania, Russia, 1880–1943)
 Peter Romanovsky (Russia, 1892–1964)
 Max Romih (Croatia, Italy, 1893–1979)
 Chris de Ronde (Netherlands, Argentina, 1912–1996)
 Catharina Roodzant (Netherlands, 1896–1999)
 Salme Rootare (Estonia, 1913–1987)
 Vidrik Rootare (Estonia, c.1900–1985)
 Jakob Rosanes (Ukraine/Austria-Hungary, Germany, 1842–1922)
 Bernardo Roselli (Uruguay, born 1965)
 Leon Rosen (Poland, US, 1869–1942)
 Andreas Rosendahl (Denmark, 1864–1909)
 Karl Wilhelm Rosenkrantz (Latvia, Russia, 1876–after 1928)
 Jacob Rosenthal (US, 1881–1954)
 Samuel Rosenthal (Poland, France 1837–1902)
 Laura Ross (US, born 1988)
 Stefano Rosselli del Turco (Italy, 1877–1947)
 Héctor Rossetto (Argentina, 1922–2009)
 Nicolas Rossolimo (Ukraine, France, US, 1910–1975)
 Gersz Rotlewi (Poland, 1889–1920)
 Eugéne Rousseau (France, c. 1810 – c. 1870)
 Jonathan Rowson (Scotland, born 1977)
 Solomon Rozental (Lithuania, Belarus, Russia, 1890–1955)
 Eduardas Rozentalis (Lithuania, born 1963)
 Vesna Rožič (Slovenia, 1987–2013)
 Levy Rozman (US, born 1995)
 Ruan Lufei (China, born 1987)
 Serge Rubanraut (China, Australia, 1948–2008)
 Karl Ruben (Denmark, 1903–1938)
 Jorge Rubinetti (Argentina, 1945–2016)
 Akiba Rubinstein (Poland, Germany, Belgium, 1882–1961)
 Emanuel Rubinstein (Poland, 1897–?)
 José Rubinstein (Argentina, 1940–1997)
 Simon Rubinstein (Austria, South Africa, c. 1910–1942)
 Solomon Rubinstein (Poland, US, 1868–1931)
 Sergei Rublevsky (Russia, born 1974)
 Olga Rubtsova (Russia, 1909–1994)
 Iosif Rudakovsky (Ukraine, 1914–1947)
 Lyudmila Rudenko (Ukraine, Russia, 1904–1986)
 Mary Rudge (England, 1842–1919)
 Nikoly Rudnev (Ukraine, Uzbekistan, 1895–1944)
 Anna Rudolf (Hungary, born 1987)
 Alexander Rueb (Netherlands, 1882–1959)
 Mikhail Rytshagov (Estonia, born 1967)

S 
 Peter Alexandrovich Saburov (Russia, 1835–1918)
 Peter Petrovich Saburov (Russia, Switzerland, 1880–1932)
 Antonio Sacconi (Italy, 1895–1968)
 Matthew Sadler (England, born 1974)
 Darmen Sadvakasov (Kazakhstan, born 1979)
 Yousof Safvat (Iran, 1940–2003)
 Pierre Charles Fournier de Saint-Amant (France, 1800–1872)
 Jaroslav Šajtar (Czechoslovakia, 1921–2003)
 Konstantin Sakaev (Russia, born 1974)
 Yuri Sakharov (Ukraine, 1922–1981)
 Valery Salov (Russia, born 1964)
 Alessandro Salvio (Italy, c. 1570 – c. 1640)
 Gersz Salwe (Poland, 1862–1920)
 Friedrich (Fritz) Sämisch (Germany, 1896–1975)
 Sergiu Samarian (Romania, Germany, 1923–1991)
 Grigory Sanakoev (Russia, 1935–2021)
 Luis Augusto Sánchez (Colombia, 1917–1981)
 Albert Sandrin Jr. (US, 1923–2004)
 Raúl Sanguineti (Argentina,  1933–2000)
 Anthony Santasiere (US, 1904–1977)
 Emmanuel Sapira (Romania, Belgium, 1900–1943)
 Ortvin Sarapu (Estonia, New Zealand, 1924–1999)
 Jonathan Sarfati (Australia, New Zealand, born 1964)
 Gabriel Sargissian (Armenia, born 1983)
 Ivan Šarić (Croatia, born 1990)
 Nihal Sarin (India, born 2004)
 Zoltan Sarosy (Hungary, Canada, 1906–2017)
 Jacob Sarratt (England, 1772–1819)
 Jeff Sarwer (Canada, born 1978)
 Krishnan Sasikiran (India, born 1981)
 Harold Saunders (England, 1875–1950)
 Stanislav Savchenko (Ukraine, born 1967)
 Vladimir Savon (Ukraine, 1940–2005)
 Gyula Sax (Hungary, 1951–2014)
 Emil Schallopp (Germany, 1843–1919)
 Morris Schapiro (Lithuania, US, 1903–1996)
 Willem Schelfhout (Netherlands, 1874–1951)
 Theodor von Scheve (Germany, 1851–1922)
 Emanuel Schiffers (Russia, 1850–1904)
 Willi Schlage (Germany, 1888–1940)
 Carl Schlechter (Austria, 1874–1918)
 Roland Schmaltz (Germany, born 1974)
 Carl Friedrich Schmid (Latvia, 1840–1897)
 Lothar Schmid (Germany, 1928–2013)
 Paul Felix Schmidt (Estonia, Germany, US, 1916–1984)
 Włodzimierz Schmidt (Poland, born 1943)
 Ludwig Schmitt (Germany, 1902–1980)
 Wilhelm Schönmann (Germany, 1889–1970)
 Georg Schories (Germany, 1874–1934)
 Karl Schorn (Germany, 1803–1850)
 Arnold Schottländer (Germany, 1854–1909)
 František Schubert (Czechoslovakia, 1894–1940)
 John William Schulten (US, 1821–1875)
 Jan Schulz (Czechoslovakia, 1899–1953)
 Aaron Schwartzman (Argentina, 1908–2013)
 Gabriel Schwartzman (Romania, US, born 1976)
 Leon Schwartzmann (Poland, France, 1887–1942)
 Paulette Schwartzmann (Latvia, France, Argentina, 1894–1953?)
 Adolf Schwarz (Hungary, Austria, 1836–1910)
 Jacques Schwarz (Austria, 1856–1921)
 Samuel Schweber (Argentina, 1936–2017)
 Marie Sebag (France, born 1986)
 Yasser Seirawan (Syria, US, born 1960)
 Adolf Seitz (Germany, Argentina 1898–1970)
 Alexey Selezniev (Russia, France, 1888–1967)
 Lidia Semenova (Ukraine, born 1951)
 Olav Sepp (Estonia, born 1969)
 Edward Guthlac Sergeant (England, 1881–1961)
 Philip Walsingham Sergeant (England, 1872–1952)
 Aleksandr Sergeyev (Russia, 1897–1970)
 Dražen Sermek (Slovenia, born 1969)
 Gregory Serper (Uzbekistan, US, born 1969)
 Samuel Sevian (US, born 2000)
 Alexander Shabalov (Latvia, US, born 1967)
 Greg Shahade (US, born 1978)
 Jennifer Shahade (US, born 1980)
 Leonid Shamkovich (Russia, Israel, US, 1923–2005)
 Gauri Shankar (India, born 1992)
 Samuel Shankland (US, born 1991)
 Andrey Shariyazdanov (Russia, born 1976)
 Elizabeth Shaughnessy (Ireland, US, born 1937)
 Shen Yang (China, born 1989)
 James Sherwin (US, England, born 1933)
 Sergei Shipov (Russia, born 1966)
 Kamran Shirazi (Iran, US, France, born 1952)
 Alexei Shirov (Latvia, Spain, born 1972)
 Nigel Short (England, born 1965)
 Jackson Showalter (US, 1860–1935)
 Yury Shulman (Belarus, US, born 1975)
 Ilya Shumov (Russia, 1819–1881)
 Polina Shuvalova (Russia, born 2001)
 Félix Sicre (Cuba, 1817–1871)
 Bruno Edgar Siegheim (Germany, South Africa, 1875–1952)
 Guðmundur Sigurjónsson (Iceland, born 1947)
 Jeremy Silman (US, born 1954)
 Vladimir Simagin (Russia, 1919–1968)
 Albert Simonson (US, 1914–1965)
 Amon Simutowe (Zambia, born 1982)
 Marcel Sisniega Campbell (Mexico, 1959–2013)
 Stanislaus Sittenfeld (Poland, France, 1865–1902)
 Sanan Sjugirov (Russia, born 1993)
 Karel Skalička (Czechoslovakia, Argentina, 1896–1979)
 Almira Skripchenko (Moldova, France, born 1976)
 Bogdan Śliwa (Poland, 1922–2003)
 Sam Sloan (United States, born 1944)
 Roman Slobodjan (Germany, born 1975)
 Jørn Sloth (Denmark, born 1944)
 Jan Smeets (Netherlands, born 1985)
 Jan Smejkal (Czechoslovakia, born 1946)
 David Smerdon (Australia, born 1984)
 Shlomo Smiltiner (Israel, 1915–2015)
 Ilya Smirin (Belarus, Israel, born 1968)
 Pavel Smirnov (Russia, born 1982)
 Stephen Francis Smith (Canada, England, 1861–1928)
 Vasily Osipovich Smyslov (Russia, 1881–1943)
 Vasily Smyslov (Russia, 1921–2010)
 Wesley So (Philippines, born 1993)
 Bartosz Soćko (Poland, born 1978)
 Monika Soćko (Poland, born 1978)
 Andrei Sokolov (Russia, France, born 1963)
 Ivan Sokolov (Bosnia, Netherlands, born 1968)
 Alexey Sokolsky (Russia, Ukraine, Belarus, 1908–1969)
 Dragan Šolak (Serbia, 1980)
 Alexander Solovtsov (Russia, 1847–1923)
 Andrew Soltis (US, born 1947)
 Ariel Sorín (Argentina, born 1967)
 Genna Sosonko (Russia, Netherlands, born 1943)
 Victor Soultanbeieff (Russia, Belgium, 1895–1972)
 Vladimir Sournin (Russia, US, 1875–1942)
 João de Souza Mendes (Brazil, 1892–1969)
 Hugo Spangenberg (Argentina, born 1975)
 Vasil Spasov (Bulgaria, born 1971)
 Boris Spassky (Russia, France, born 1937)
 Jon Speelman (England, born 1956)
 Abraham Speijer (Netherlands, 1873–1956)
 Rudolf Spielmann (Austria, Sweden, 1883–1942)
 Kevin Spraggett (Canada, born 1954)
 Ana Srebrnič (Slovenia, born 1984)
 Gideon Ståhlberg (Sweden, 1908–1967)
 Wilhelm von Stamm (Latvia, ?–1905)
 Philipp Stamma (Syria, England, France, 1705–1755)
 Nikolaus Stanec (Austria, born 1968)
 Charles Stanley (England, US, 1819–1901)
 Nava Starr (Latvia, Canada, born 1949)
 Howard Staunton (England, 1810–1874)
 Michael Stean (England, born 1953)
 Antoaneta Stefanova (Bulgaria, born 1979)
 Hannes Stefánsson (Iceland, born 1972)
 Elias Stein (Alsace, Netherlands, 1748–1812)
 Leonid Stein (Ukraine, 1934–1973)
 Endre Steiner (Hungary, 1901–1944)
 Lajos Steiner (Hungary, Australia 1903–1975)
 Herman Steiner (Slovakia/Hungary, US, 1905–1955)
 Wilhelm Steinitz (Bohemia, Austria, England, US, 1836–1900)
 Daniël Stellwagen (Netherlands, born 1987)
 Károly Sterk (Hungary, 1881–1946)
 Adolf Stern (Germany, 1849–1907)
 Agnes Stevenson (England, before 1901–1935)
 Lara Stock (Croatia, born 1992)
 Mark Stolberg (Russia, 1922–1943)
 Gösta Stoltz (Sweden, 1904–1963)
 Leon Stolzenberg (Poland, US, 1895–1974)
 Zurab Sturua (Georgia, born 1964)
 Mihai Șubă (Romania, born 1947)
 Mladen Šubarić (Croatia, 1908–1991)
 Hugo Süchting (Germany, 1874–1916)
 Alexey Suetin (Russia, 1926–2001)
 Berthold Suhle (Poland, Germany, 1837–1904)
 Franciszek Sulik (Poland, Argentina, Australia, 1908–2000)
 Šarūnas Šulskis (Lithuania, born 1972)
 Aaron Summerscale (England, born 1969)
 Anne Sunnucks (England, 1927–2014)
 Jaime Sunye Neto (Brazil, born 1957)
 Emil Sutovsky (Azerbaijan, Israel, born 1977)
 Duncan Suttles (Canada, born 1945)
 Evgeny Sveshnikov (Latvia, 1950–2021)
 Dmitry Svetushkin (Moldova, 1980–2020)
 Peter Svidler (Russia, born 1976)
 Rudolf Swiderski (Germany, 1878–1909)
 Eugenio Szabados (Hungary, Italy, 1898–1974)
 László Szabó (Hungary, 1917–1998)
 Gedali Szapiro (Poland, Israel, 1929–1972)
 Salomon Szapiro (Poland, 1882–1944)
 Rudolph Sze (China, US, c.1890–1938)
 József Szén (Hungary, 1805–1857)
 József Szily (Hungary, 1913–1976)
 Jorge Szmetan (Argentina, 1950–2015)
 Aleksander Sznapik (Poland, born 1951)
 Abram Szpiro (Germany, Poland, 1912–1943)

T 
 Mark Taimanov (Ukraine, Russia, 1926–2016)
 Sándor Takács (Hungary, 1893–1932)
 Mikhail Tal (Latvia, 1936–1992)
 Tan Chengxuan (China, born 1963)
 Hiong Liong Tan (Indonesia, Netherlands, 1938–2009)
 Lian Ann Tan (Singapore, born 1947)
 Tan Zhongyi (China, born 1991)
 László Tapasztó (Hungary, Venezuela, US, born 1930)
 James Tarjan (US, born 1952)
 Siegbert Tarrasch (Germany, 1862–1934)
 Savielly Tartakower (Austria/Poland, France, 1887–1956)
 Jean Taubenhaus (Poland, France, 1850–1919)
 Lev Taussig (Czechoslovakia, 1880–?)
 Povilas Tautvaišas (Lithuania, US, 1916–1980)
 Jan Willem te Kolsté (Netherlands, 1874–1936)
 Richard Teichmann (Germany, 1868–1925)
 Oscar Tenner (Germany, US, 1880–1948)
 Rudolf Teschner (Germany, 1922–2006)
 Vitaly Teterev (Belarus, born 1983)
 Praveen Thipsay (India, born 1959)
 Murugan Thiruchelvam (England, born 1988)
 George Alan Thomas (Turkey, England, 1881–1972)
 James Thompson (England, US, 1804–1870)
 Theophilus Thompson (US, 1855 – after 1940?)
 Tian Tian (China, born 1983)
 Viktor Tietz (Czechoslovakia, 1859–1937)
 Hans Tikkanen (Sweden, born 1985)
 Jan Timman (Netherlands, born 1951)
 Gert Jan Timmerman (Netherlands, born 1956)
 Artyom Timofeev (Russia, born 1985)
 Samuel Tinsley (England, 1847–1903)
 Sergei Tiviakov (Russia, Netherlands, born 1973)
 Jonathan Tisdall (US, Norway, born 1958)
 Vladislav Tkachiev (Russia, Kazakhstan, France born 1973)
 Miodrag Todorcevic (Serbia, France, born 1940)
 Alexander Tolush (Russia, 1910–1969)
 Evgeny Tomashevsky (Russia, born 1987)
 Vasilije Tomović  (Montenegro, 1906–?)
 Tong Yuanming (China, born 1972)
 Alice Tonini (Italy, ?)
 Veselin Topalov (Bulgaria, born 1975)
 Eugenio Torre (Philippines, born 1951)
 Carlos Torre Repetto (México, 1902–1978)
 Yury Toshev (Bulgaria, 1907–1974)
 Izaak Towbin (Ukraine, Poland, 1899–1941)
 Karel Traxler (Czechoslovakia, 1866–1936)
 Lawrence Trent (England, born 1986)
 František Treybal (Czechoslovakia, 1882–1942)
 Karel Treybal (Czechoslovakia, 1885–1941)
 George Treysman (US, 1881–1959)
 Petar Trifunović (Croatia, Serbia, 1910–1980)
 Georgi Tringov (Bulgaria, 1937–2000)
 Paul Truong (Vietnam, US, born 1965)
 Cindy Tsai (US, born 1985)
 Anatol Tschepurnoff (Finland, 1871–1942)
 Mark Tseitlin (Russia, Israel, born 1943)
 Mikhail Tseitlin (Belarus, Russia, born 1947)
 Vitaly Tseshkovsky (Russia, 1944–2011)
 Alexander Tsvetkov (Bulgaria, 1914–1990)
 Leon Tuhan-Baranowski (Poland, Germany, 1907–1954)
 Vladimir Tukmakov (Ukraine, born 1946)
 Johannes Türn (Estonia, 1899–1993)
 Abe Turner (US, 1924–1962)
 Maxim Turov (Russia, born 1979)
 Isador Samuel Turover (Belgium, US, 1892–1978)
 Theodore Tylor (England, 1900–1968)
 Dimitri Tyomkin (Canada, born 1977)
 Alexandru Tyroler (Romania, 1891–1990)

U 
 Louis Uedemann (US, 1854–1912)
 Shinsaku Uesugi (Japan, born 1991)
 Wolfgang Uhlmann (Germany, 1935–2020)
 Tüdeviin Üitümen (Mongolia, 1939–1993)
 Maximilian Ujtelky (Hungary/Slovakia, 1915–1979)
 Mikhail Ulibin (Russia, born 1971)
 Mikhail Umansky (Russia, 1952–2010)
 Wolfgang Unzicker (Germany, 1925–2006)
 Anna Ushenina (Ukraine, born 1985)

V 
 Maxime Vachier-Lagrave (France, born 1990)
 Rafael Vaganian (Armenia, born 1951)
 Samuil Vainshtein (Russia, 1894–1942)
 Anatoly Vaisser (Kazakhstan, France, born 1949)
 Povilas Vaitonis (Lithuania, Canada, 1911–1983)
 Árpád Vajda (Hungary, 1896–1967)
 Francisco Vallejo Pons (Spain, born 1982)
 Michael Valvo (US, 1942–2004)
 Johannes van den Bosch (Netherlands, 1906–1994)
 Arnold van den Hoek (Netherlands, 1921–1945)
 Paul van der Sterren (Netherlands, born 1956)
 John van der Wiel (Netherlands, born 1959)
 Dirk van Foreest (Netherlands, 1862–1956)
 Jorden van Foreest (Netherlands, born 1999)
 Lucas van Foreest (Netherlands, born 2001)
 Norman van Lennep (Netherlands, 1872–1897)
 Herman Claudius van Riemsdijk (Netherlands, Brazil, born 1948)
 Theo van Scheltinga (Netherlands, 1914–1994)
 Louis van Vliet (Netherlands, 1870–1932)
 Loek van Wely (Netherlands, born 1972)
 Cyril Vansittart (England, Italy, 1852–1887)
 Zoltán Varga (Hungary, born 1970)
 Egon Varnusz (Hungary, 1933–2008)
 Evgeni Vasiukov (Russia, 1933–2018)
 Petar Velikov (Bulgaria, born 1951)
 Dragoljub Velimirović (Serbia, 1942–2014)
 Gavriil Veresov (Russia, 1912–1979)
 Beniamino Vergani (Italy, 1863–1927)
 Giovanni Vescovi (Brazil, born 1978)
 Boris Verlinsky (Ukraine, Russia, 1888–1950)
 Milan Vidmar (Slovenia, 1885–1962)
 Milan Vidmar Jr. (Slovenia, 1909–1980)
 Subbaraman Vijayalakshmi (India, born 1979)
 Benito Villegas, (Argentina, 1877–1952)
 Yakov Vilner (Ukraine, 1899 – c. 1930)
 William Samuel Viner (Australia, 1881–1933)
 Fernando Visier Segovia (Spain, born 1943)
 Isakas Vistaneckis (Lithuania, Israel, 1910–2000)
 Nikita Vitiugov (Russia, born 1987)
 Alvis Vītoliņš (Latvia, 1946–1997)
 Evgeny Vladimirov (Kazakhstan, born 1957)
 Erwin Voellmy (Switzerland, 1886–1951)
 Sergey Volkov (Russia, born 1974)
 Andrei Volokitin (Ukraine, born 1986)
 Larissa Volpert (Russia, 1926–2017)
 Andrey Vovk (Ukraine, born 1991)
 Yuri Vovk (Ukraine, born 1988)
 Zvonko Vranesic (Croatia, Canada, born 1938)
 Milan Vukcevich (Serbia, US, 1937–2003)
 Milan Vukić (Serbia, Bosnia, born 1942)
 Vladimir Vuković (Croatia, 1898–1975)
 Konstantin Vygodchikov (Belarus, Russia, 1892–1941)
 Alexey Vyzmanavin (Russia, 1960–2000)

W 
 Robert Wade (New Zealand, England, 1921–2008)
 Alexander Wagner (Poland, 1868–1942)
 Heinrich Wagner (Germany, 1888–1959)
 Victor Wahltuch (England, 1875–1953)
 Josh Waitzkin (United States, born 1976)
 Carl August Walbrodt (Netherlands, Germany, 1871–1902)
 George Walker (England, 1803–1879)
 Max Walter (Slovakia, 1896–1940)
 Wang Hao (China, born 1989)
 Wang Lei (China, born 1975)
 Wang Pin (China, born 1974)
 Puchen Wang (China, New Zealand, born 1990)
 Wang Rui (China, born 1978)
 Wang Yu (China, born 1982)
 Wang Yue (China, born 1987)
 Chris Ward (England, born 1968)
 Preston Ware (US, 1821–1891)
 Cathy Warwick (England, born 1968)
 Miyoko Watai (Japan, born 1945)
 John L. Watson (US, born 1951)
 William Watson (England, born 1962)
 William Wayte (England, 1829–1898)
 Simon Webb (England, 1949–2005)
 Tom Wedberg (Sweden, born 1953)
 Henri Weenink (Netherlands, 1892–1931)
 Otto Wegemund (Germany, 1870–1928)
 Wei Yi (China, born 1999)
 Wolfgang Weil (Austria, 1912–1945)
 Max Weiss (Hungary, Austria, 1857–1927)
 Peter Wells (England, born 1965)
 Carl Wemmers (Germany, 1845–1882)
 Wen Yang (China, born 1988)
 Jan Werle (Netherlands, born 1984)
 Guy West (Australia, born 1958)
 Heikki Westerinen (Finland, born 1944)
 Bernardo Wexler (Romania, Argentina, 1925–1992)
 Kasimir de Weydlich (Poland, 1859–1913)
 Norman Tweed Whitaker (US, 1890–1975)
 Michael Wiedenkeller (Sweden, born 1963)
 Arthur Wijnans (Indonesia, Netherlands, 1920–1945)
 Elijah Williams (England, 1810–1854)
 Simon Williams (England, born 1979)
 Szymon Winawer (Poland, 1838–1920)
 Karl Gottlieb von Windisch (Slovakia, Hungary, Austria, 1725–1793)
 Peter Winston (US, born 1958)
 William Winter (England, 1898–1955)
 Victor Winz (Germany, Israel, Argentina, 1906-?)
 John Wisker (England, 1846–1884)
 Alexander Wittek (Croatia, Austria, 1852–1894)
 Aleksandar Wohl (Australia, born 1963)
 Antoni Wojciechowski (Poland, 1905–1938)
 Radosław Wojtaszek (Poland, born 1987)
 Aleksander Wojtkiewicz (Latvia, Poland, US, 1963–2006)
 Heinrich Wolf (Austria, 1875–1943)
 Siegfried Reginald Wolf (Austria, Israel, 1867–1951)
 Paula Wolf-Kalmar (Austria, 1881–1931)
 Balduin Wolff (Germany, 1819–1907)
 Patrick Wolff (US, born 1968)
 Wong Meng Kong (Singapore, born 1963)
 Baruch Harold Wood (England, 1909–1989)
 Wu Mingqian (China, born 1961)
 Wu Shaobin (Singapore, 1969)
 Wu Wenjin (China, born 1976)
 Marmaduke Wyvill (England, 1814–1896)

X 
 Xie Jun (China, born 1970)
 Jeffery Xiong (US, born 2000)
 Xu Jun (China, born 1962)
 Xu Yuanyuan (China, born 1981)
 Xu Yuhua (China, born 1976)

Y 
 Yuri Yakovich (Russia, born 1962)
 Daniel Yanofsky (Poland, Canada, 1925–2000)
 Frederick Yates (England, 1884–1932)
 Ye Jiangchuan (China, born 1960)
 Ye Rongguang (China, born 1963)
 Olavo Yépez (Ecuador, 1937–2021)
 Trotzky Yepez (Ecuador, 1940–2010)
 Alex Yermolinsky (US, born 1958)
 Betül Cemre Yıldız (Turkey, born 1989)
 Yin Hao (China, born 1979)
 Carissa Yip (US, born 2003)
 Jennifer Yu (US, born 2002)
 Yu Shaoteng (China, born 1979)
 Leonid Yudasin (Russia, Israel, born 1959)
 Mikhail Yudovich (Russia, 1911–1987)
 Peter Yurdansky (Russia, 1891–1937)
 Artur Yusupov (Russia, Germany, born 1960)

Z 
 Józef Żabiński (Poland, 1860–1928)
 Aron Zabłudowski (Poland, 1909–1941)
 Aldo Zadrima (Albania, born 1948)
 Vladimir Zagorovsky (Russia, 1925–1994)
 Sergey Zagrebelny (Uzbekistan, born 1965)
 Alexander Zaitsev (Russia, 1935–1971)
 Igor Zaitsev (Russia, born 1938)

 Lazar Zalkind (Ukraine, 1886–1945)
 Oswaldo Zambrana (Bolivia, born 1981)
 Abram Zamikhovsky (Ukraine, 1908–1978)
 Alonso Zapata (Colombia, born 1958)
 Pablo Zarnicki (Argentina, born 1972)
 Anna Zatonskih (Ukraine, US, born 1978)
 Tatiana Zatulovskaya (Azerbaijan, Russia, Israel, 1935–2017)
 Beata Zawadzka (Poland, born 1986)
 Jolanta Zawadzka (Poland, born 1987)
 Elmārs Zemgalis (Latvia, US, 1923–2014)

 Zhang Jilin (China, born 1986)
 Zhang Pengxiang (China, born 1980)
 Zhang Weida (China, born 1949)
 Zhang Xiaowen (China, born 1989)
 Zhang Zhong (China, Singapore, born 1978)
 Zhao Jun (China, born 1986)
 Zhao Lan (China, born 1963)
 Zhao Xue (China, born 1985)
 Zhao Zong-Yuan (China, Australia, born 1986)
 Viktor Zheliandinov (Ukraine, 1935–2021)
 Zhou Jianchao (China, born 1988)
 Zhou Weiqi (China, born 1986)
 Zhu Chen (China, born 1976)
 Natalia Zhukova (Ukraine, born 1979)
 Yaacov Zilberman (Israel, born 1954)
 Otto Zimmermann (Switzerland, 1892–1979)
 Adolf Zinkl (Bohemia, Austria, 1871–1944)
 Emil Zinner (Czechoslovakia, 1909–1942)
 František Zíta (Czechoslovakia, 1909–1977)
 Eugene Znosko-Borovsky (Russia, France, 1884–1954)
 Leo Zobel (Slovakia, 1895–1962)
 Alexander Zubarev (Ukraine, born 1979)
 Nikolai Zubarev (Russia, 1894–1951)
 Bernard Zuckerman (US, born 1943)
 Igor Zugic (Canada, born 1981)
 Johannes Zukertort (Poland, Germany, England, 1842–1888)
 Vadim Zvjaginsev (Russia, born 1976)
 Kira Zvorykina (Ukraine, Russia, Belarus 1919–2014)
 Adolf Zytogorski (Poland, England, –1882)

Famous people connected with chess

The people in this list are famous in other areas of activity, but are known to have played chess, or have declared an interest in the game, or created works of art and literature in which the game is prominently featured.

Computers

 Deep Blue, the IBM chess playing computer, was victorious in a 1997 match against then-world champion Garry Kasparov.
 Deep Thought, an earlier version of Deep Blue, won many computer chess championships.
 Deep Fritz achieved a draw in the 2002 match, "Brains in Bahrain", against Vladimir Kramnik. A variant, X3D Fritz, drew against Kasparov in 2004, and the version Deep Fritz 10 defeated the world champion Vladimir Kramnik in 2006.
 Houdini (chess) Since the release of version 1.5 on 15 December 2010, it has taken the top spot in every rating list that includes it.
 Hydra (chess) is a very strong machine which uses custom parallel hardware.
 Junior is the winner of the 2006 World Computer Chess Championship, its third victory at this event.
 Rybka is a recent engine. As of December 2006, Rybka has topped all chess engine rating lists and won the 2007 WCCC.
 Shredder is another strong program, having won the WCCC twice.

See also

 World Chess Championship
 Women's World Chess Championship
 World Junior Chess Championship
 List of Armenian chess players
 List of Indian chess players
 List of Israeli chess players
 List of Russian chess players
 List of female chess players
 List of chess grandmasters
 List of amateur chess players
 List of chess players by peak FIDE rating

References

External links
 
 
 

Players